= Mintons =

English pottery company (1793–2005)

Mintons Limited
- Industry: Pottery
- Founded: 1793
- Founder: Thomas Minton & Joseph Poulson
- Defunct: 2005
- Fate: Merged with Royal Doulton Tableware Ltd in 1968
- Headquarters: Stoke-upon-Trent, England
- Key people: Herbert Minton, Michael Hollins, Colin Minton Campbell, Leon Arnoux
- Products: Earthenware, stoneware, bone china, Parian, Encaustic tiles, mosaic, Della Robbia ware, Victorian majolica, Palissy ware, "Secessionist" ware

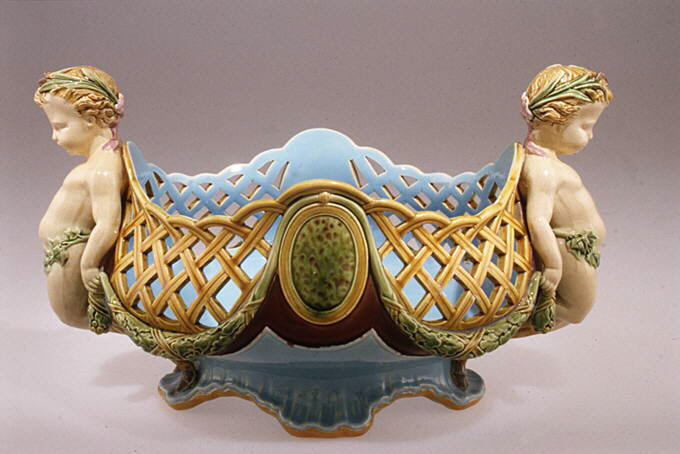
Vase in coloured lead-glazed Victorian majolica, designed by Carrier-Belleuse, 1868.

Mintons was a major company in Staffordshire pottery, "Europe's leading ceramic factory during the Victorian era", an independent business from 1793 to 1968. It was a leader in ceramic design, working in a number of different ceramic bodies, decorative techniques, and "a glorious pot-pourri of styles – Rococo shapes with Oriental motifs, Classical shapes with Medieval designs and Art Nouveau borders were among the many wonderful concoctions". As well as pottery vessels and sculptures, the firm was a leading manufacturer of tiles and other architectural ceramics, producing work for both the Houses of Parliament and United States Capitol.

The family continued to control the business until the mid-20th century. Mintons had the usual Staffordshire variety of company and trading names over the years, and the products of all periods are generally referred to as either "Minton", as in "Minton china", or "Mintons", the mark used on many. Mintons Ltd was the company name from 1879 onwards.

== History ==
=== 1793 to 1850 ===
The firm began in 1793 when Thomas Minton (1765–1836) founded his pottery factory in Stoke-upon-Trent, Staffordshire, England, as "Thomas Minton and Sons", producing earthenware. He formed a partnership, Minton & Poulson, c.1796, with Joseph Poulson who made bone china from c.1798 in his new nearby china pottery. When Poulson died in 1808, Minton carried on alone, using Poulson's pottery for china until 1816. He built a new china pottery in 1824. No very early earthenware is marked, and perhaps a good deal of it was made for other potters. On the other hand, some very early factory records survive in the Minton Archive, which is much more complete than those of most Staffordshire firms, and the early porcelain is marked with pattern numbers, which can be tied to the surviving pattern-books.

Early Mintons products were mostly standard domestic tableware in blue transfer-printed or painted earthenware, including the ever-popular Willow pattern. Minton had trained as an engraver for transfer printing with Thomas Turner. From c. 1798 production included bone china from Poulson's china pottery. China production ceased c. 1816 following Poulson's death in 1808, recommencing in a new pottery in 1824.

Minton was a prime mover, and the main shareholder, in the Hendra Company, formed in 1800 to exploit china clay and other minerals from Cornwall. Named after Hendra Common, St Dennis, Cornwall, the partners included Minton, Poulson, Wedgwood, William Adams, and the owners of New Hall porcelain. The company was profitable for many years, reducing the cost of materials to the owning potters, and selling to other firms.

Early Mintons porcelain was "decorated in the restrained Regency style", much of it just with edging patterns rather than fully painted scenes, thus keeping prices within the reach of a relatively large section of the middle class.

Early porcelain

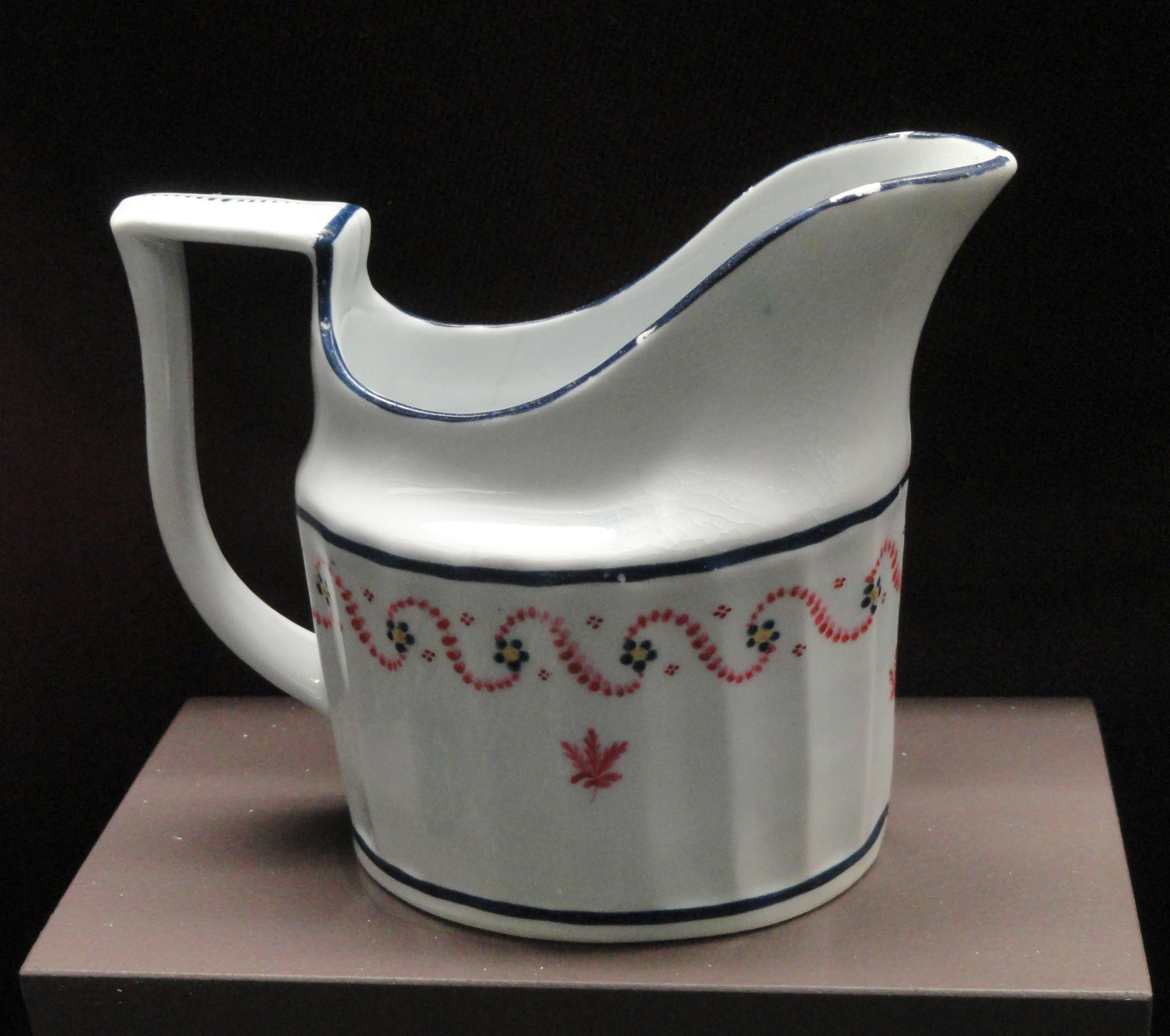
Creamer, fluted Old Oval shape, c. 1797-1799

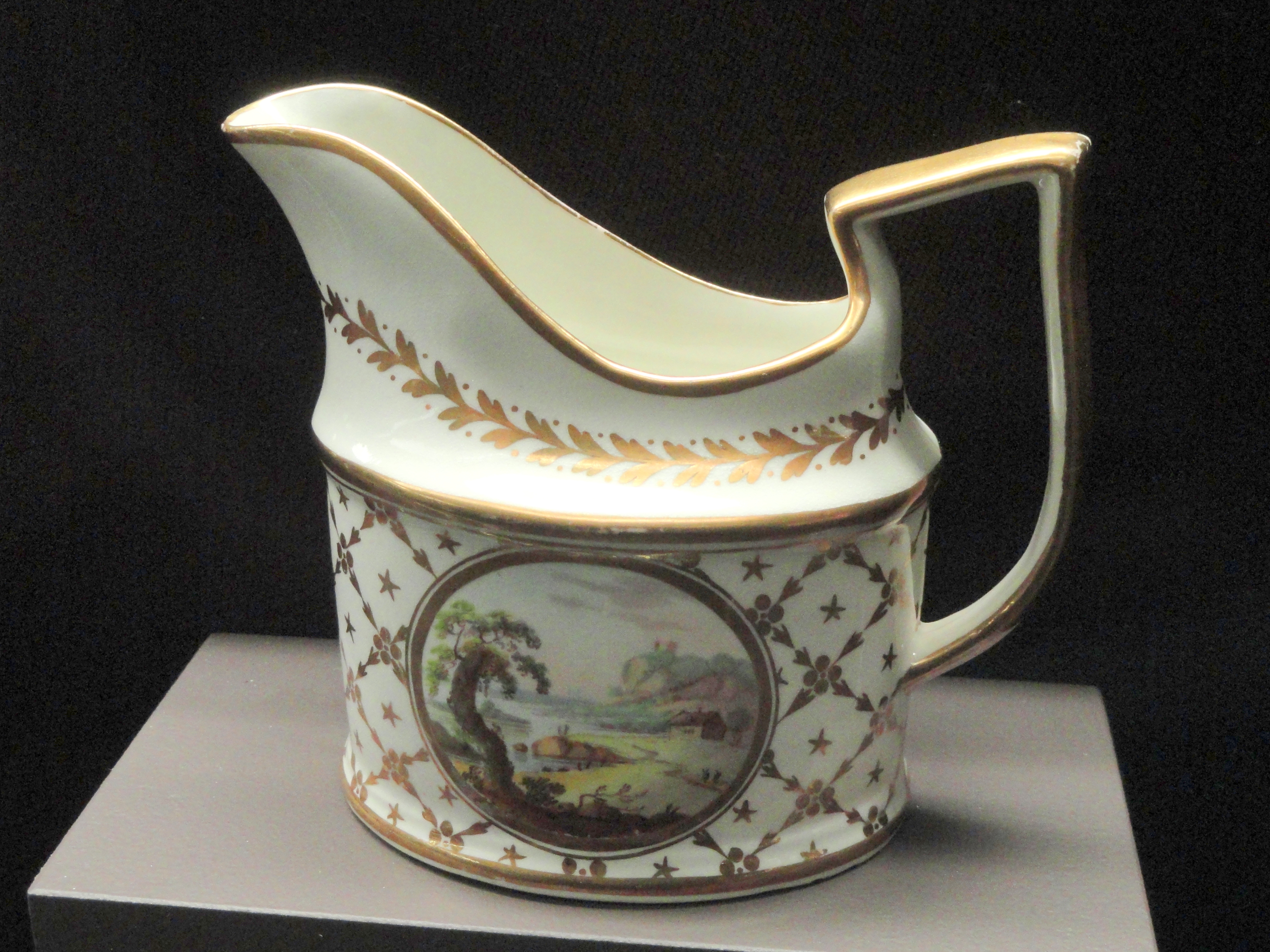
Creamer, Old Oval shape, c. 1800-1815

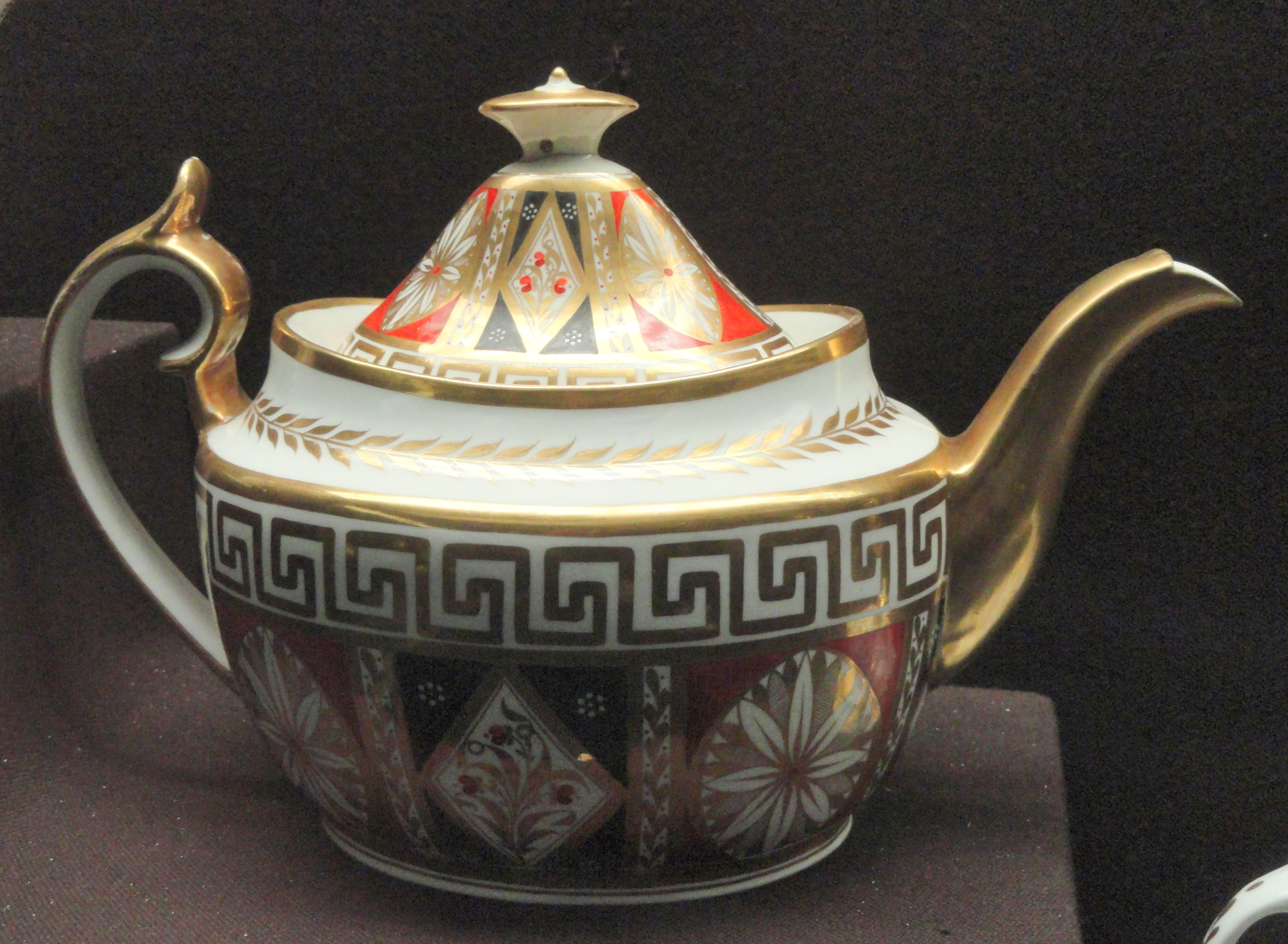
Teapot and stand, New Oval shape, c. 1800-1805

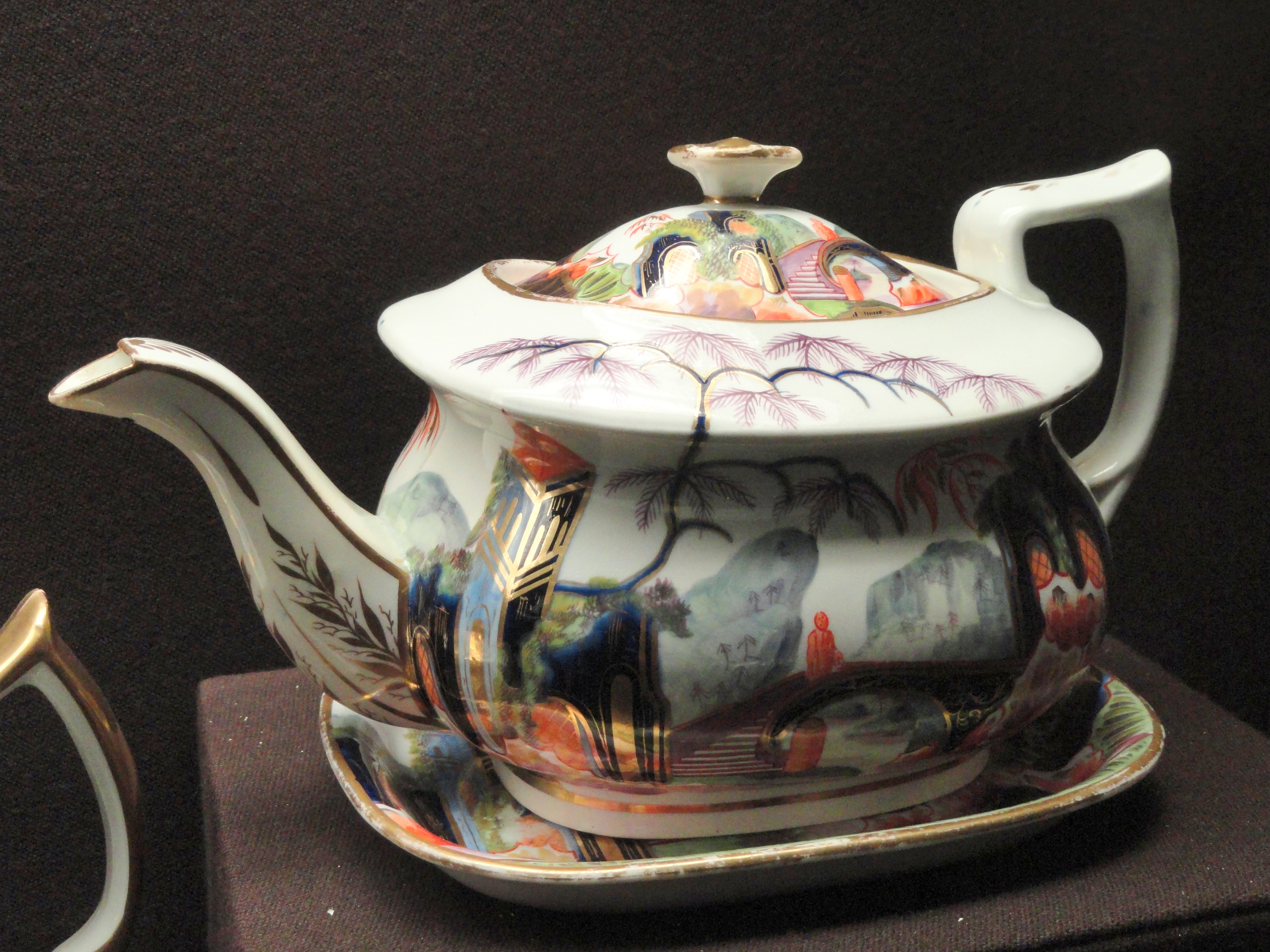
Teapot and stand, London shape, c. 1813-1816

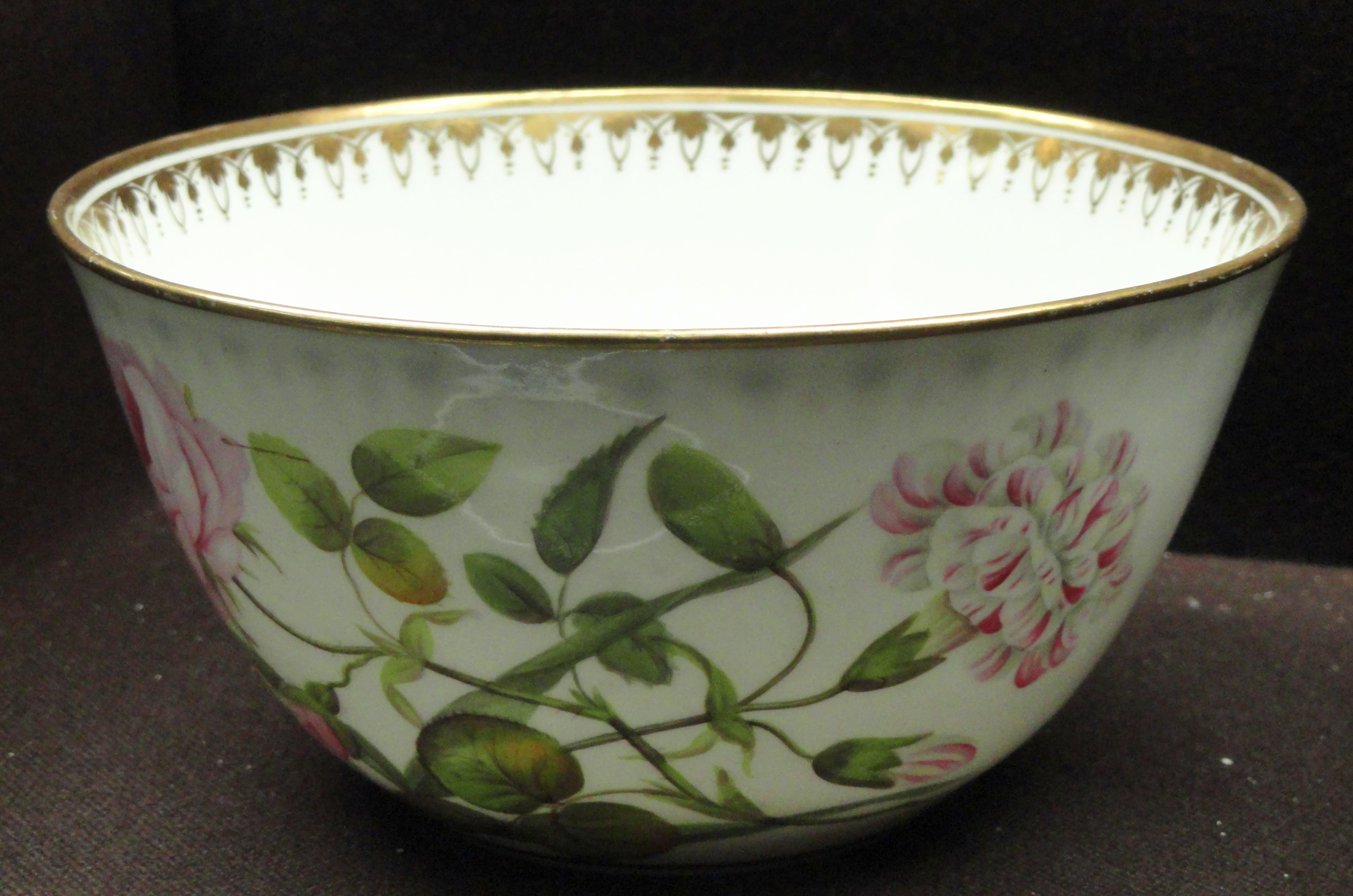
Slop bowl, c. 1812-1815

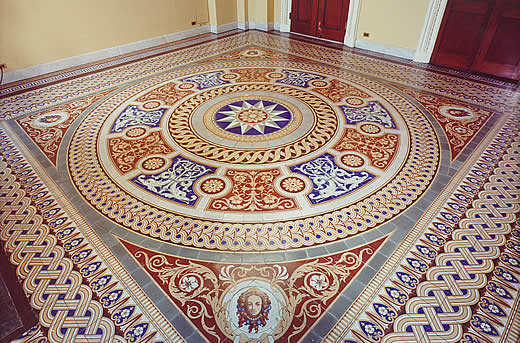
Mintons encaustic tile floor at the United States Capitol, 1856

Minton's two sons, Thomas and Herbert, were taken into partnership in 1817, but Thomas went in to the church and was ordained in 1825. Herbert had been working in the business since 1808, when he was 16, initially as a travelling salesman. On his death in 1836, Minton was succeeded by his son Herbert Minton (1793–1858), who took John Boyle as a partner to help him the same year, given the size of the business; by 1842 they had parted company. Herbert developed new production techniques and took the business into new fields, notably including decorative encaustic tile making, through his association with leading architects and designers including Augustus Pugin and, it is said, Prince Albert.

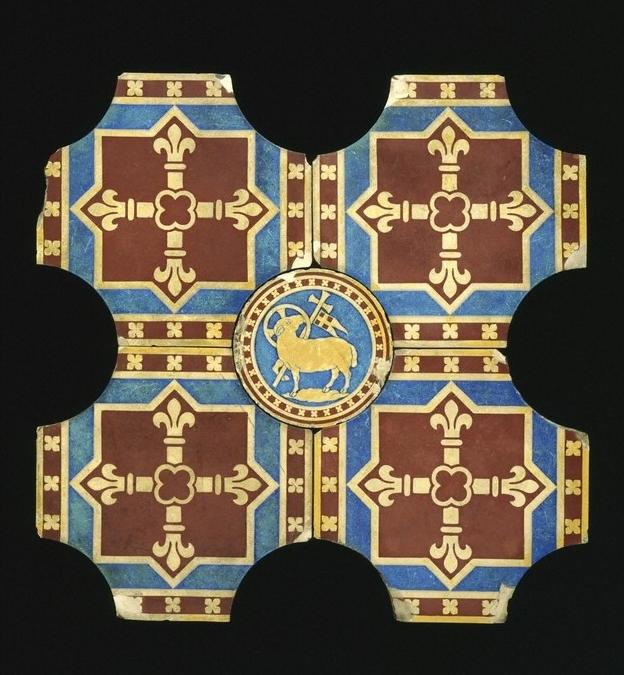
Group of 5 Pugin tiles for the new St George's Cathedral, Southwark, 1847–48, with German bomb damage.

Minton entered into partnership with Michael Hollins in 1845 and formed the tile-making firm of Minton, Hollins & Company, which was at the forefront of a large newly developing market as suppliers of durable decorative finishes for walls and floors in churches, public buildings, grand palaces and simple domestic houses. The firm exhibited widely at trade exhibitions throughout the world and examples of its exhibition displays are held at the Smithsonian Institution in Washington, D.C., where the company gained many prestigious contracts including tiled flooring for the United States Capitol. The "encaustic" technique allowed clays of different colours to be used in the same tile, allowing far greater decorative possibilities. Great numbers of new churches and public buildings were given floors in the tiles, and despite the protests of William Morris, many medieval church floors were "updated" with them.

Hard white unglazed "statuary porcelain", later called Parian ware because of its resemblance to Parian marble, was first introduced by Spode in the 1840s. It was further developed by Minton who employed John Bell, Hiram Powers and other famous sculptors to produce figures for reproduction. Mintons had already been making some figures in the more demanding medium of biscuit porcelain, and reused some of these moulds in Parian.

In the year ended 1842, the sales of the main company Minton & Co totalled (all round £'000s) £45K, divided as follows:

- Porcelain: gilt £13K and ungilt £8K
- Earthenware: enamelled £6K, printed £10K, "cream-colour" £4K, coloured bodies £2K
- Ironstone: 2K

Much of the transfer printing was done by outside specialists, and "engraving done off the Works" cost £641, while "engraving done on the Works" cost £183.

1820 to 1850

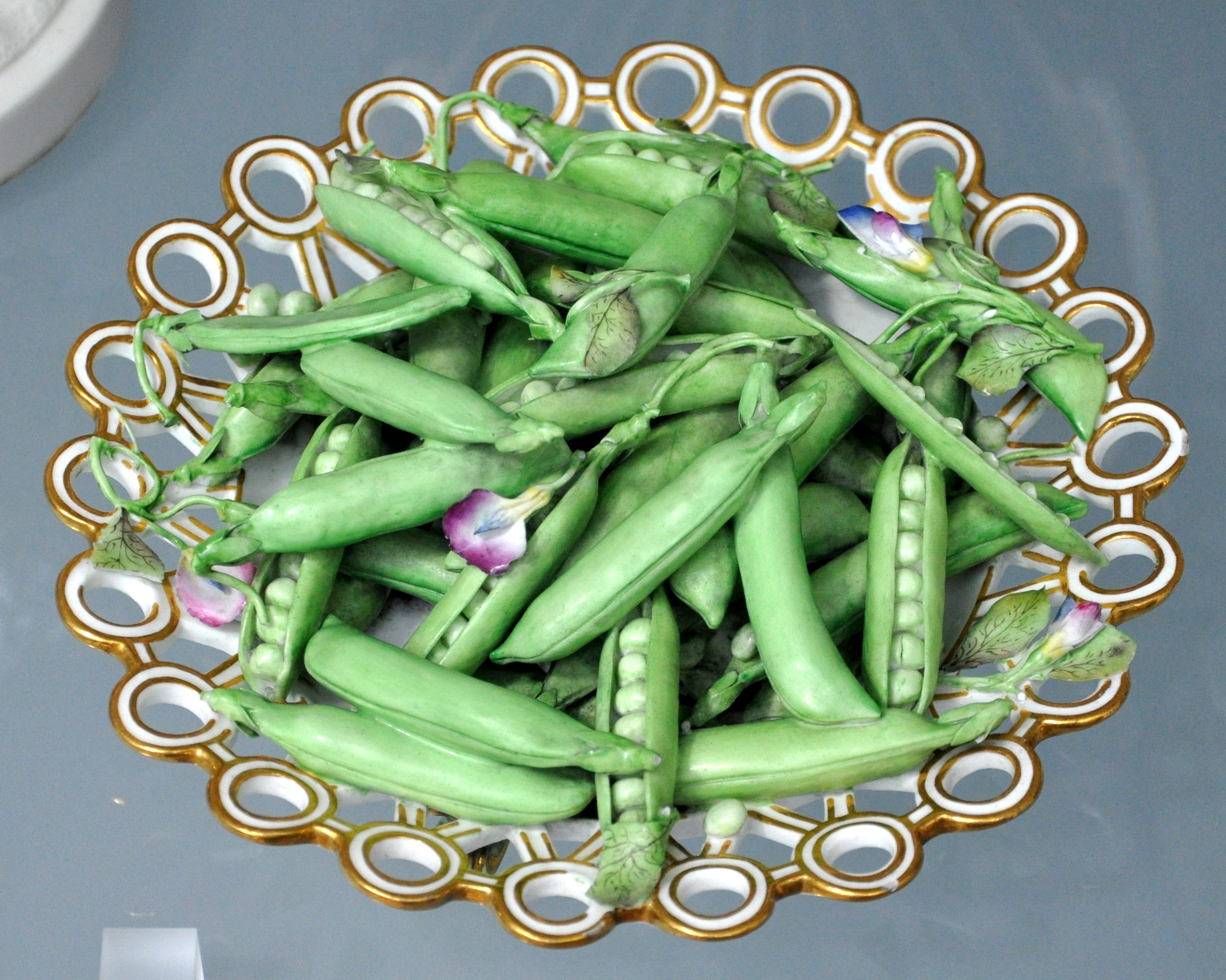
"Cheater" dish with peas, c. 1820

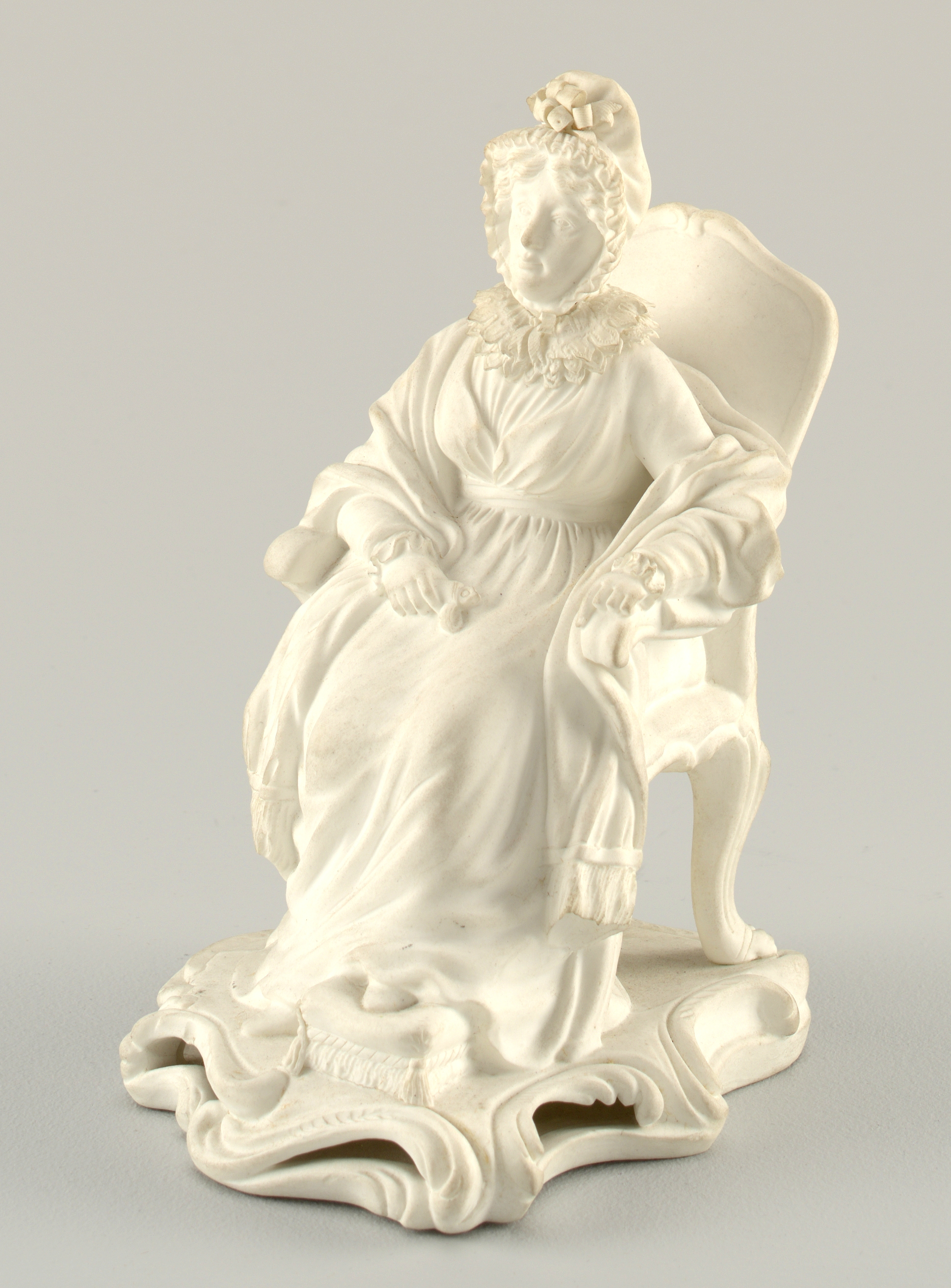
Biscuit porcelain figure of Hannah More, 1830s

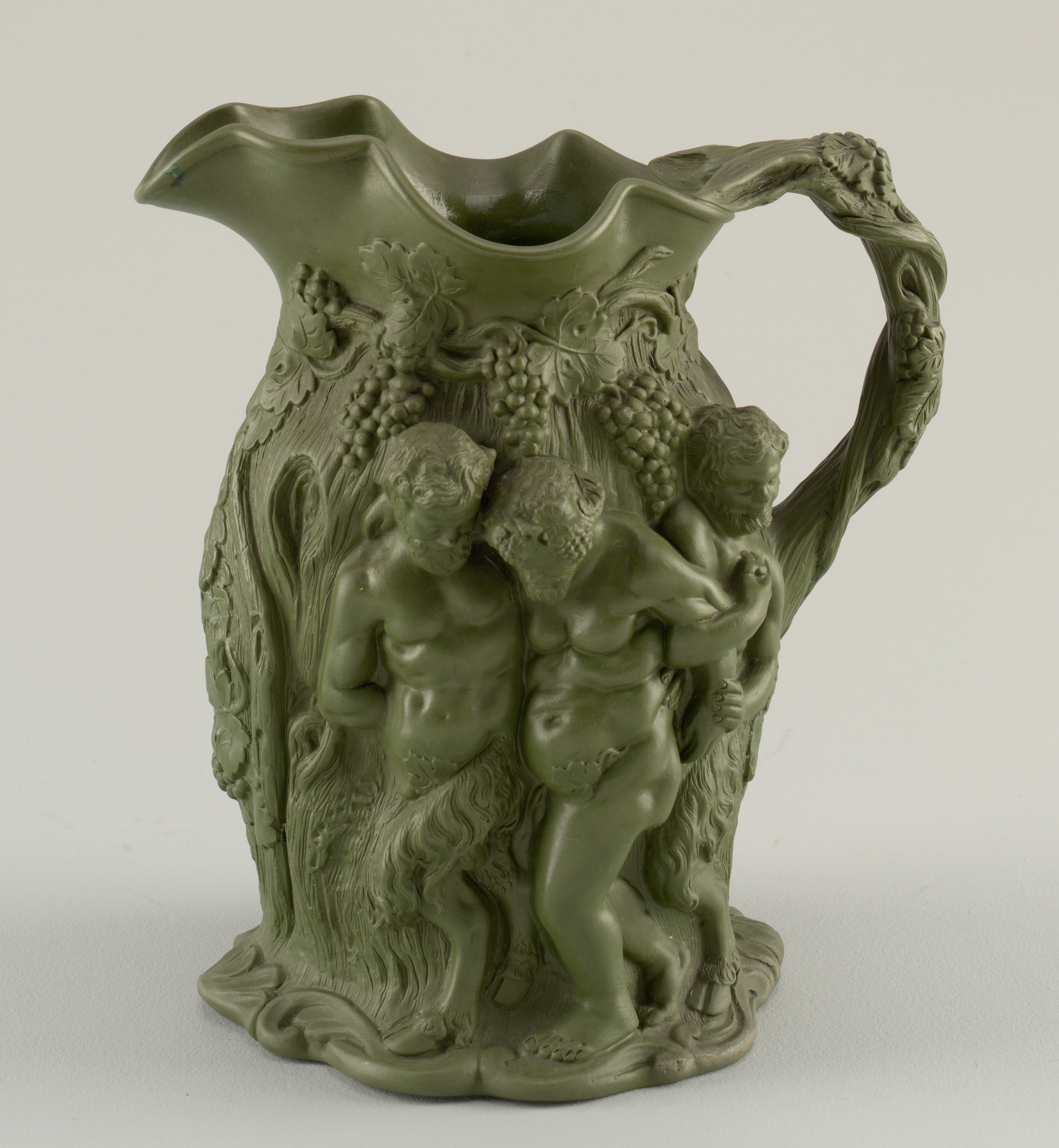
Jug with Silenus, glazed stoneware, 1840

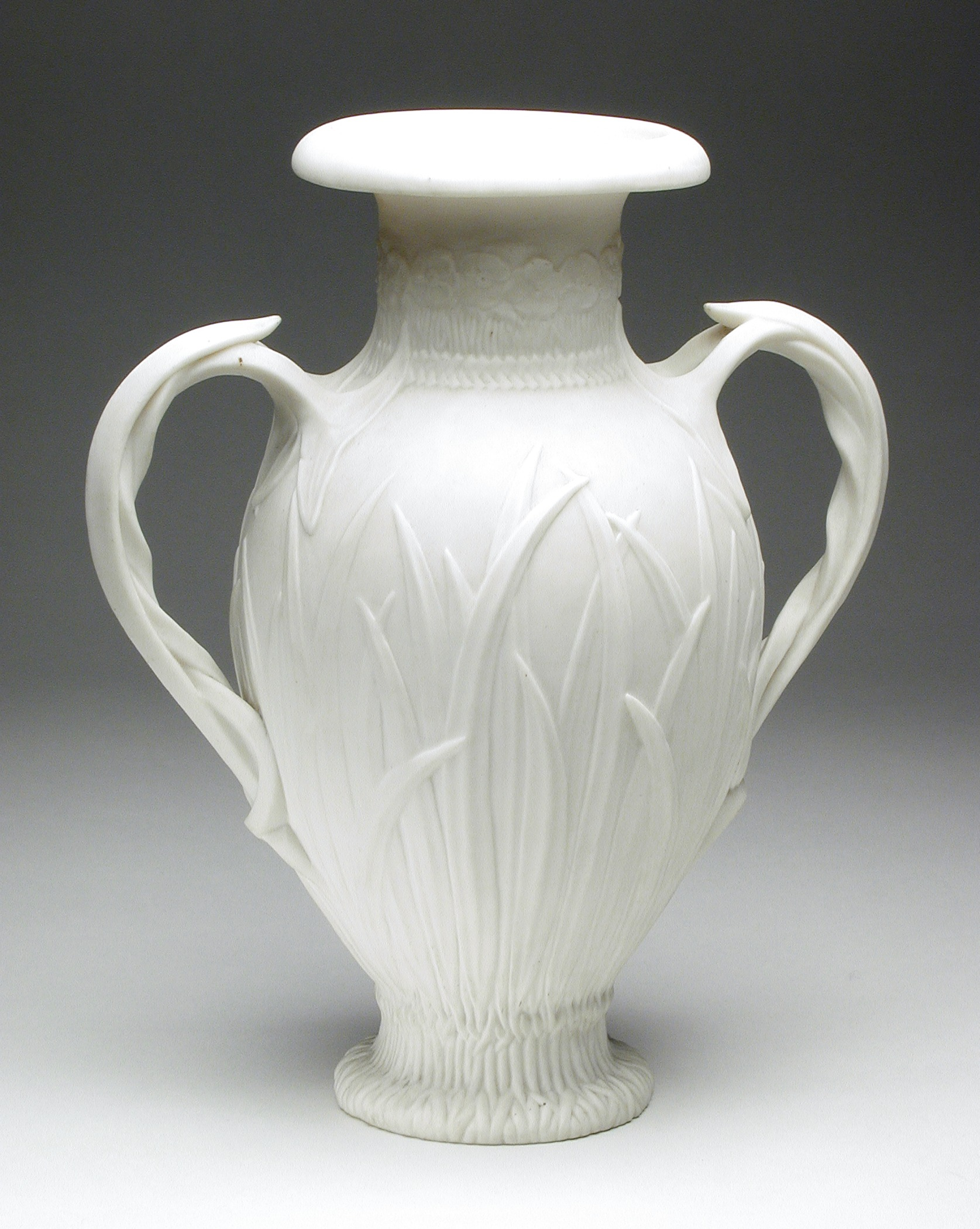
The 'Well Spring' Vase, an early Parian ware design by Richard Redgrave, c. 1847

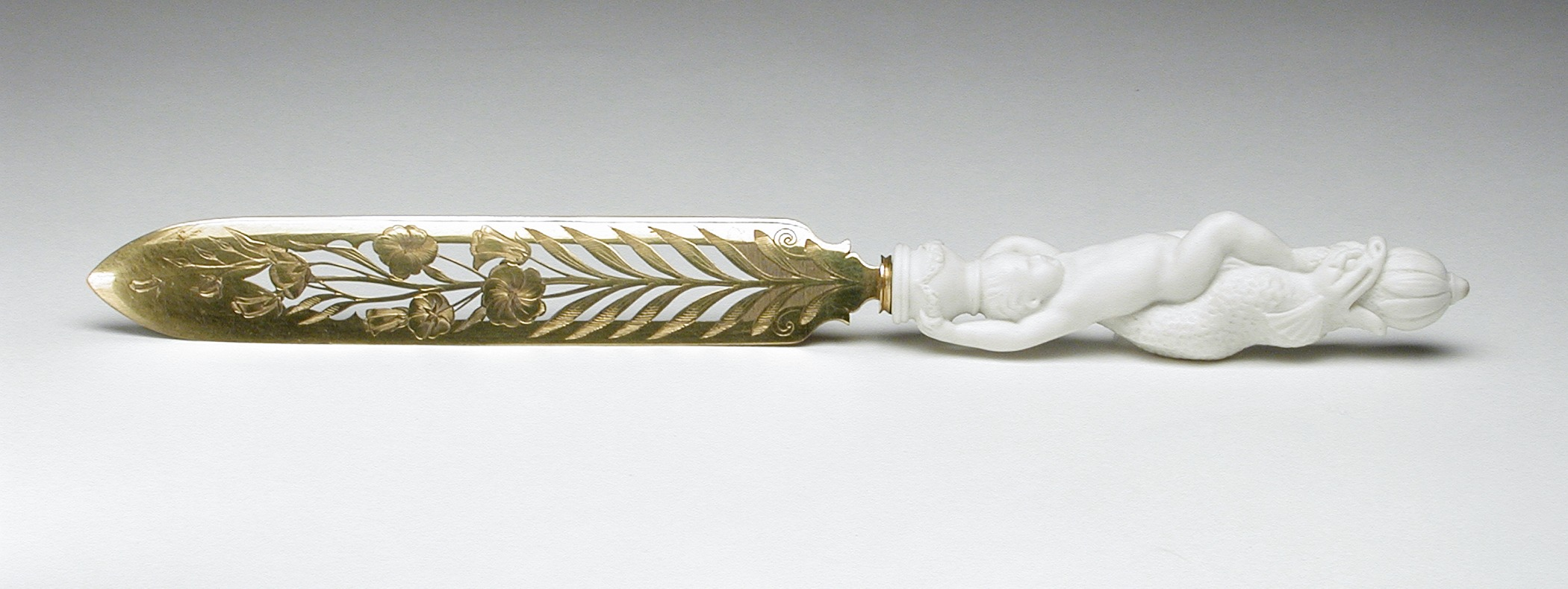
Paper knife, Parian ware and gilt metal, c. 1847

=== Mid-Victorian period ===
In 1849 Minton engaged a young French ceramicist Léon Arnoux as art director who remained with the Minton Company until 1892. This and other enterprising appointments enabled the company greatly to widen its product ranges. It was Arnoux who formulated the tin-glaze used for Minton's rare tin-glazed Majolica together with the in-glaze metallic oxide enamels with which it was painted. He also developed the colored lead glazes and kiln technology for Minton's highly successful lead-glazed Palissy ware, later also called 'majolica'. This product transformed Minton's profitability for the next thirty years. Minton tin-glazed majolica imitated the process and style of Italian Renaissance tin-glazed maiolica, resulting in fine in-glaze brush-painted decoration on an opaque whitish ground. Minton coloured-glaze-decorated Palissy ware/majolica employed an existing process much improved and with an extended range of coloured lead glazes applied to the biscuit body and fired. Both products were launched at the Great Exhibition of 1851 in London. The majolica of this and other English factories all are now grouped as Victorian majolica. The coloured glazes of Palissy ware became a Mintons staple, as well as being copied by many other firms in England and abroad.

Mintons made special pieces for the major exhibitions that were a feature of the period, beginning with the Great Exhibition, where they had considerable success, winning the bronze medal for "beauty and originality of design". They followed this with a gold medal at the Exposition Universelle of 1855 in Paris. In London Queen Victoria bought Parian pieces and, for 1,000 guineas, a dessert service in a mix of bone china and Parian, which she gave to Emperor Franz Joseph of Austria; it remains in the Hofburg in Vienna.

Lead-glazed "majolica", and grand Victorian showpieces

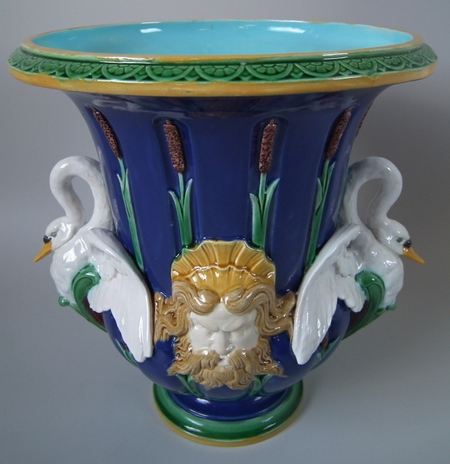
c. 1855

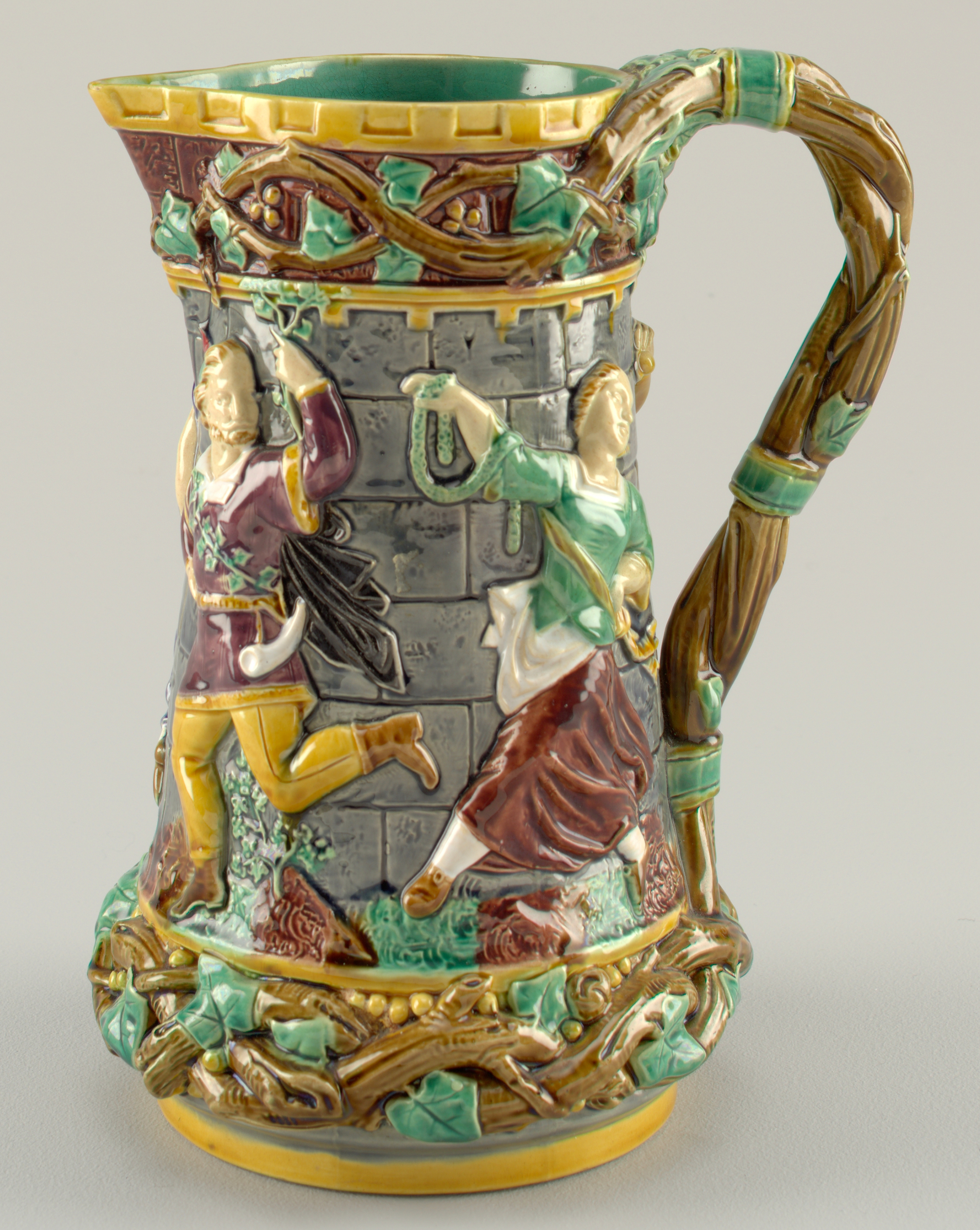
Jug with dancing medieval figures, 1868

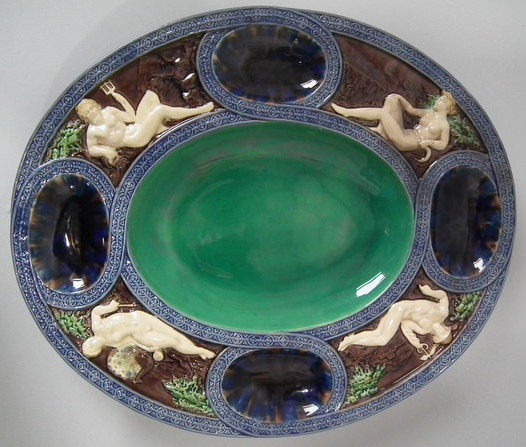
Platter with Juno, Neptune, Mercury, Selene, c. 1875. Unlike much "Palissy Ware", this is close to actual Renaissance pieces.

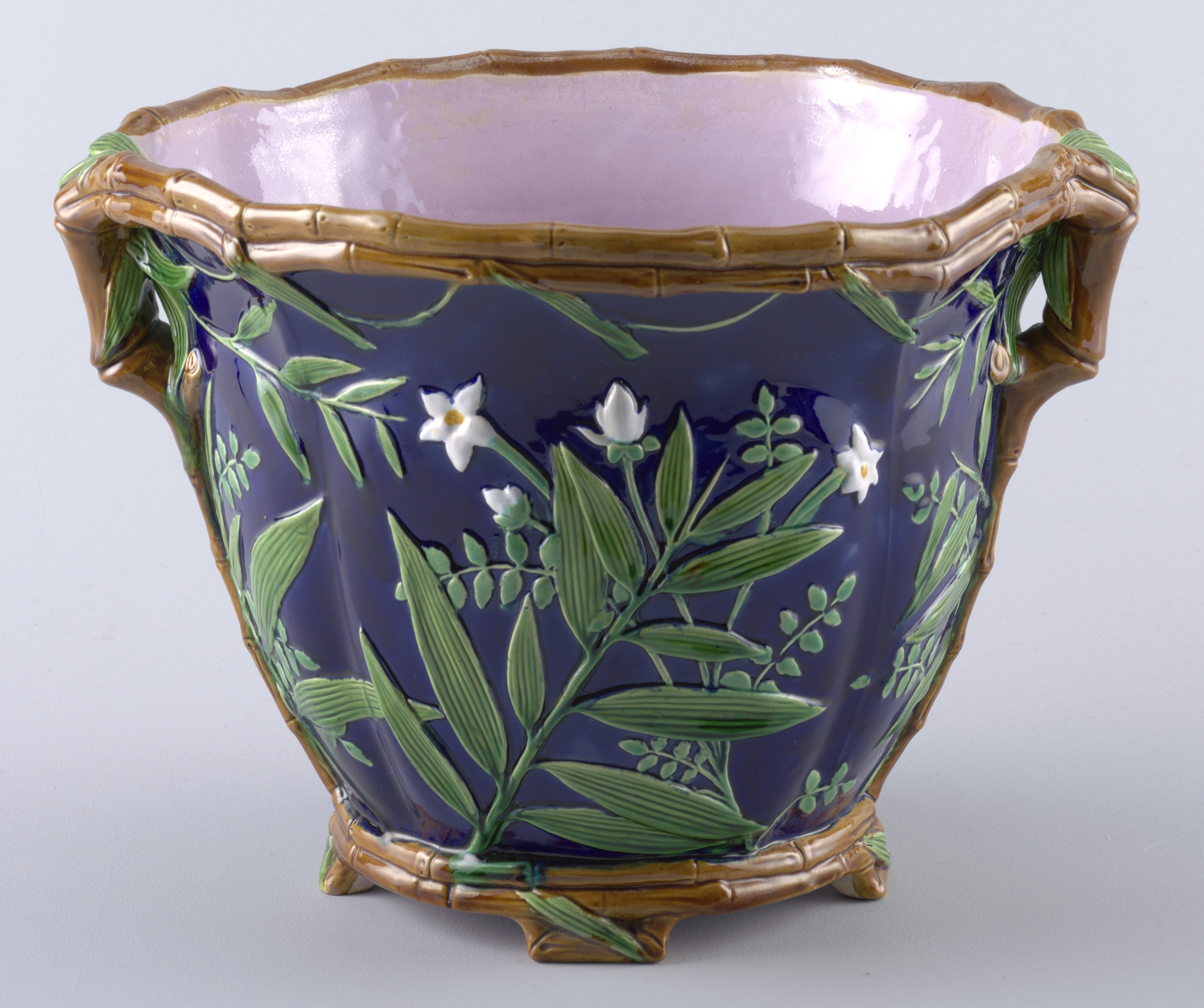
Planter, c. 1880

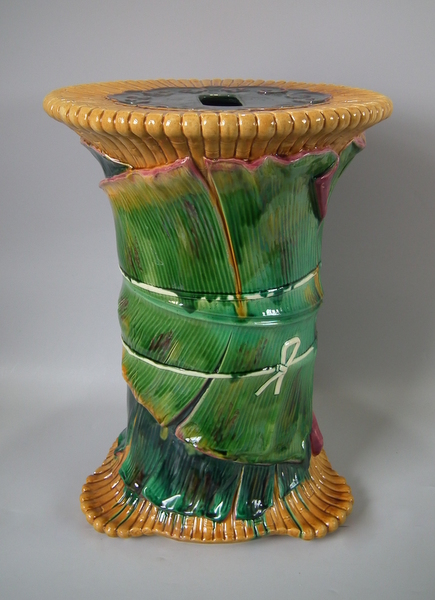
Banana leaf garden seat

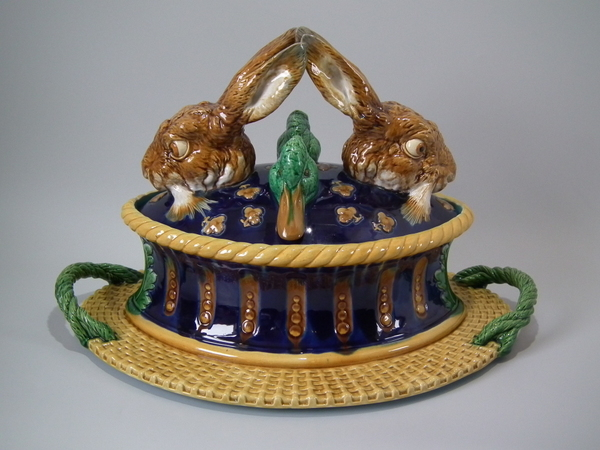
Pie-dish with heads of hares and ducks

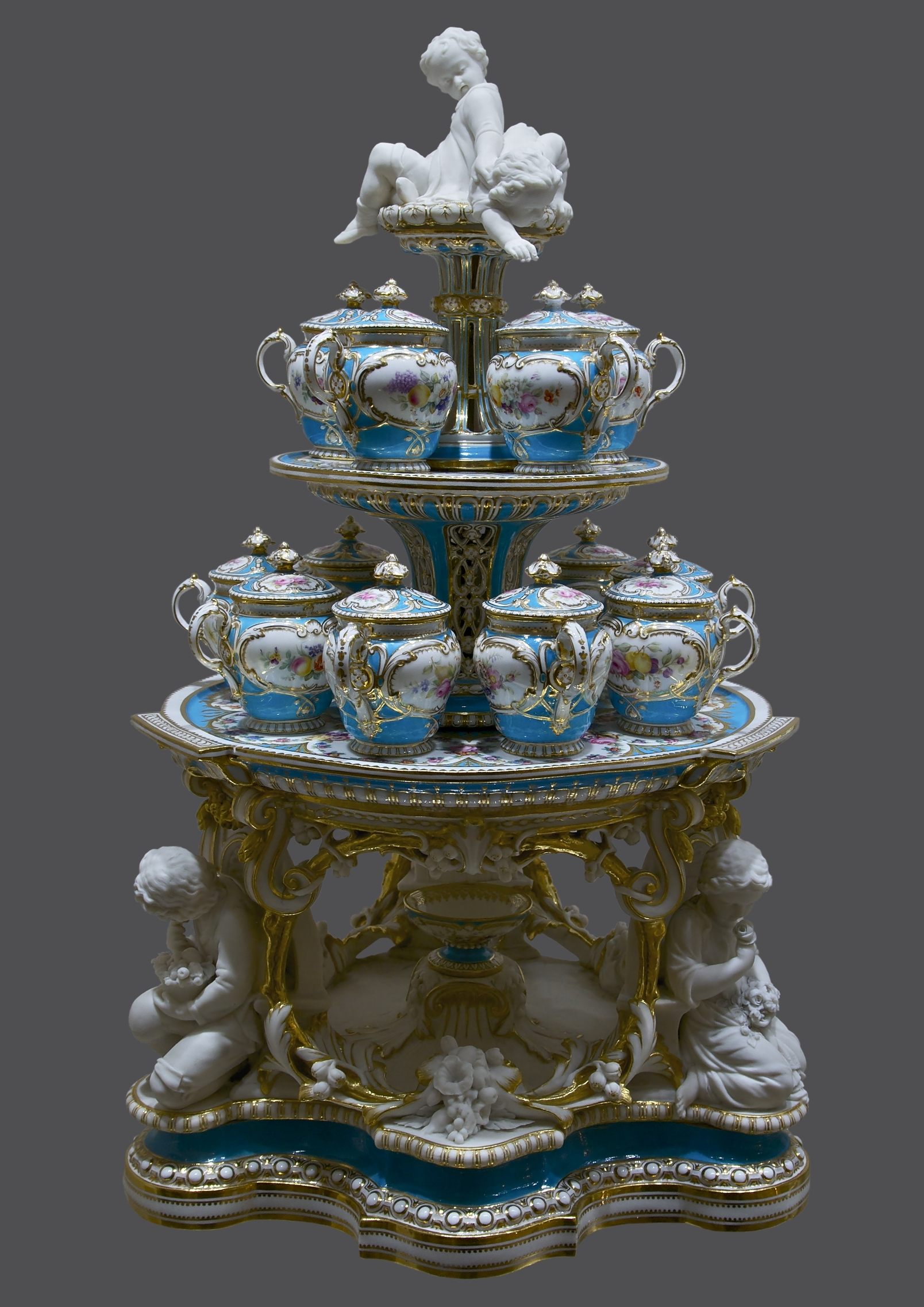
Centrepiece with cream jugs, 1851; part of the dessert service Queen Victoria gave to Emperor Franz Joseph of Austria

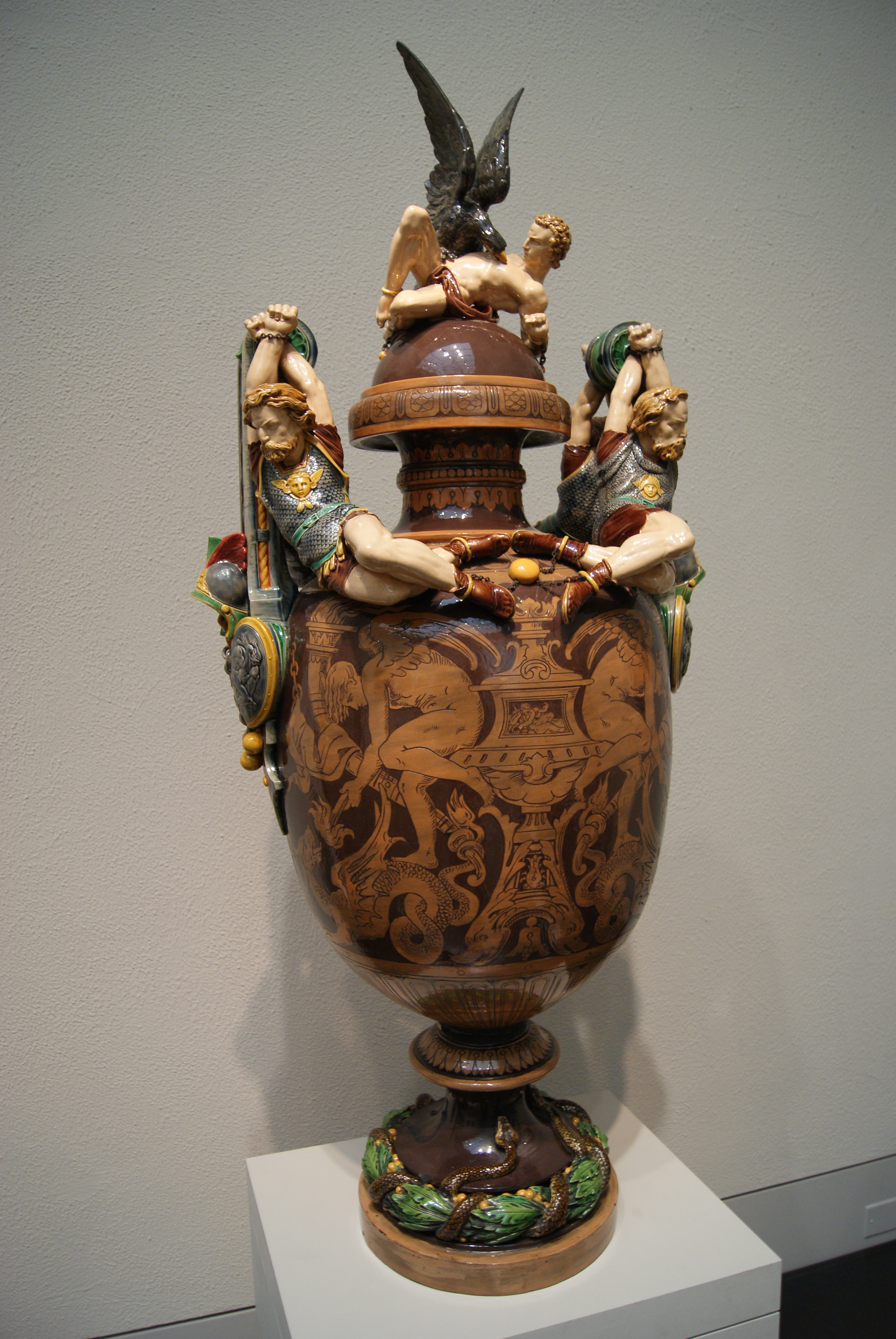
The "Prometheus Vase", 1867, in various techniques

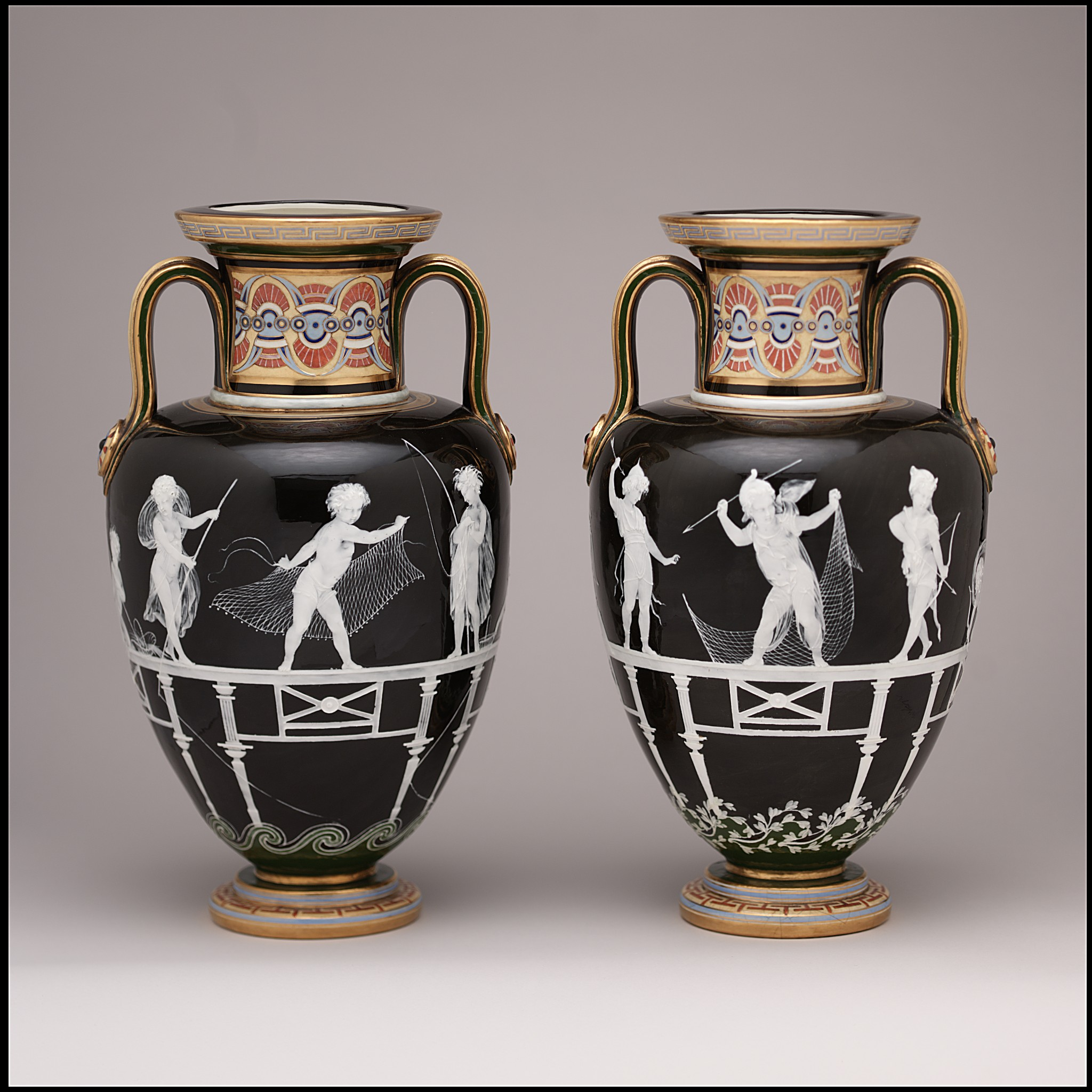
Pair of pâte-sur-pâte vases by Marc-Louis Solon, 1870

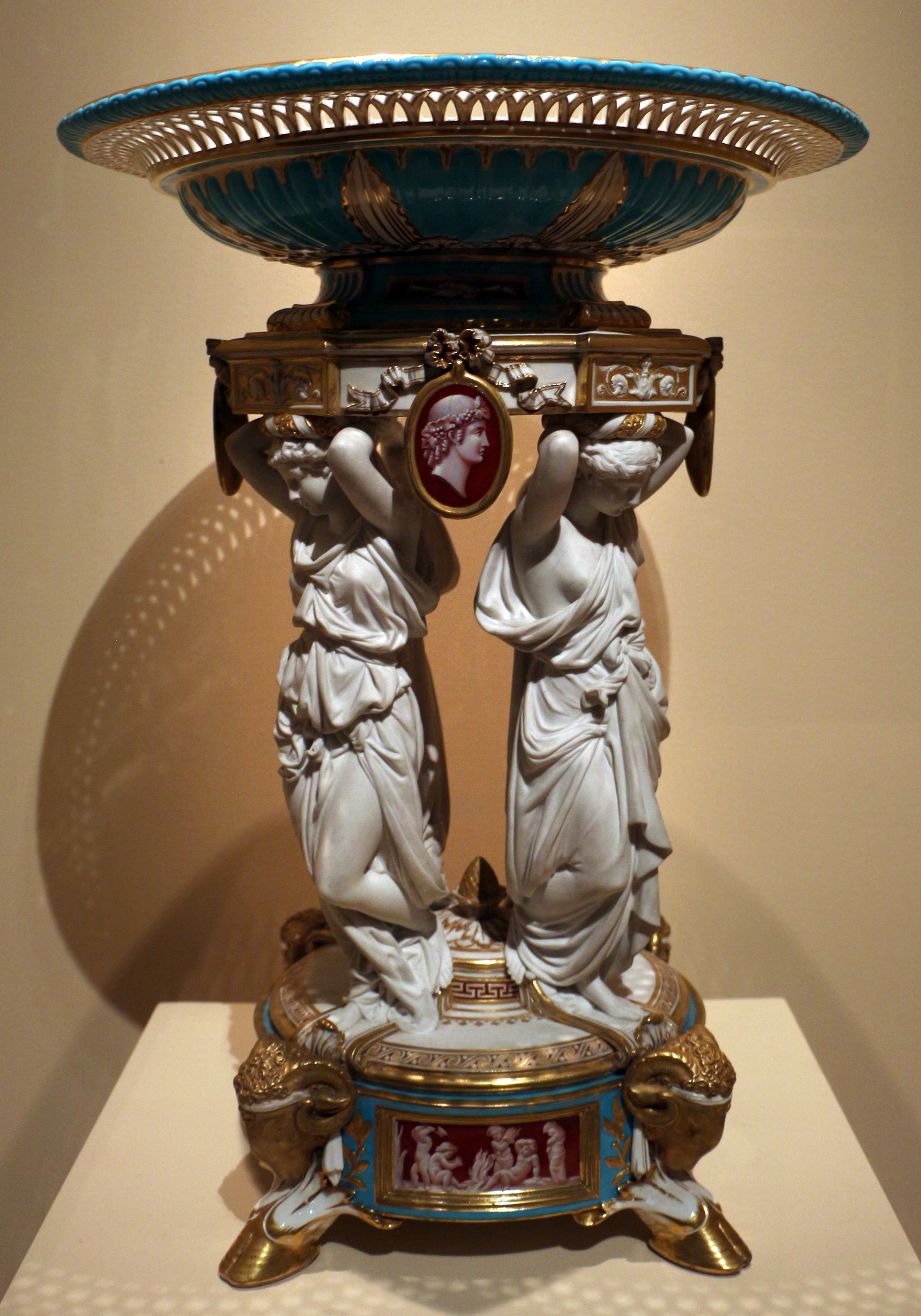
Grand incense-burner in various techniques

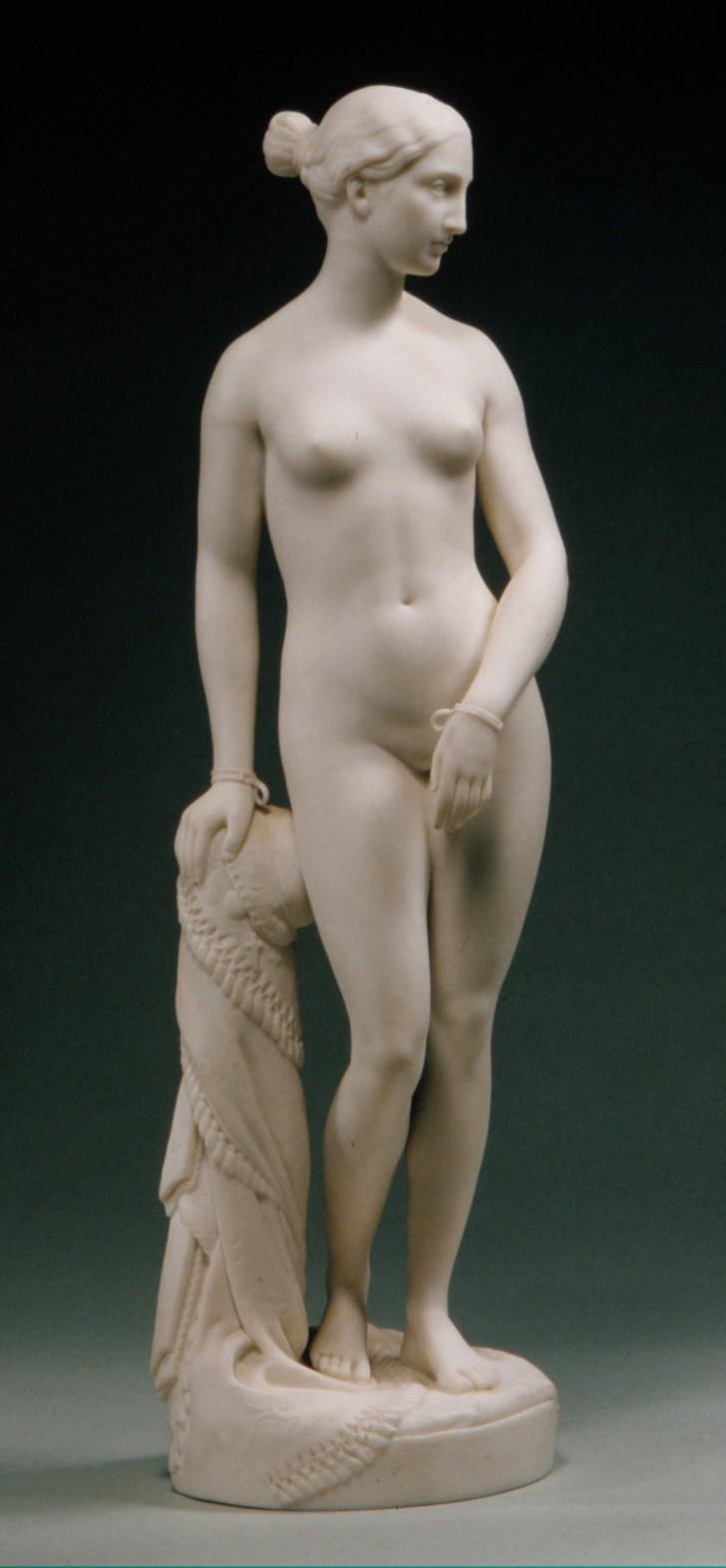
Copy in Parian ware of Hiram Powers' hit sculpture The Greek Slave, 1849. 14 1/2 inches high, where the original was life-size.

The next 25 years saw Mintons develop several new specialities in design and technique, while production of established styles continued unabated. As at Sèvres itself, and many other factories, wares evoking Sèvres porcelain of the 18th century had become popular from about the 1830s, and Arnoux perfected Mintons' blue and pink ground colours, essential for the Sèvres style, but much used for other wares. The Sèvres pink was called rose Pompadour, leading Mintons to call theirs rose du Barry after another royal mistress. Alexandre Brongniart (1770–1847), artistic director of Sèvres, had given Mintons plaster casts of some original moulds, which enabled them to make very close copies. At the end of the century, when the husband of Georgina Ward, Countess of Dudley, sold his original Sèvres pot-pourri vase in the shape of a ship, a famous, spectacular and rare Sèvres shape of the 1760s (now Getty Museum) in the 1880s, Mintons were commissioned to make a copy.

Parian ware, introduced in the 1840s, had become a strong area for Mintons, whose catalogue of 1852 already offered 226 figures in it, priced from an extremely modest two shillings for a dog, to six guineas for a classical figure. In that decade partly tinted Parian figures were introduced, and part-gilded ones. Copies of contemporary sculptures that had been hits at the Royal Academy Summer Exhibition or elsewhere were produced at a much-reduced scale in Parian. The American sculptor Hiram Powers' hit sculpture The Greek Slave was first made in 1843 in Florence, and by the end of the decade some of the five life-size versions he made had toured several countries. Mintons first made a copy in 1848; by the version illustrated here, from 1849, the figure had lost the heavy chains between her hands, which were perhaps too expensive to make for a popular product.

Arnoux had an interest in reviving Saint-Porchaire ware, then generally known as "Henri II ware". This was very high-quality lead-glazed earthenware made from the 1520s to the 1540s in France; in 1898 the pottery was attributed to the village of Saint-Porchaire (nowadays a part of Bressuire, Poitou). Perhaps sixty original pieces survive, and at the time the ware had a legendary reputation. This was a very complicated ware to make, with much use of inlays of clay with different colours. Arnoux mastered the technique and then taught Charles Toft, perhaps Mintons' top modeller, who produced a small number of pieces. In addition to his influence on the production of encaustic tiles and mosaics, Arnoux also developed and produced azulejos in the Portuguese style.

At some point before 1867 Mintons began to work with Christopher Dresser, often regarded as the most important British designer of the later 19th century. At that time he was beginning what became a strong interest in ceramic design, leading him to work with several other companies. His work with Mintons continued for several decades, and although the Minton Archive has many designs certainly in his hand, other pieces in his style can only be attributed to him. Dresser had travelled to Japan, and in the 1870s produced a number of designs reflecting Japanese ceramics, catching the rising fashion for Japonism in all areas of design. He was also interested in what might be called the "Anglo-Oriental" style, evoking both Islamic and East Asian design, but without precisely following anything.

On his death in 1858 Herbert Minton was succeeded by his equally dynamic nephew Colin Minton Campbell who had joined the partnership in 1849, with a 1/3 share. Herbert had decreased his involvement in day-to-day management in the years before his death. He took the company into a highly successful exploration of Chinese cloisonné enamels, Japanese lacquer and Turkish pottery.

Eclectic revival styles

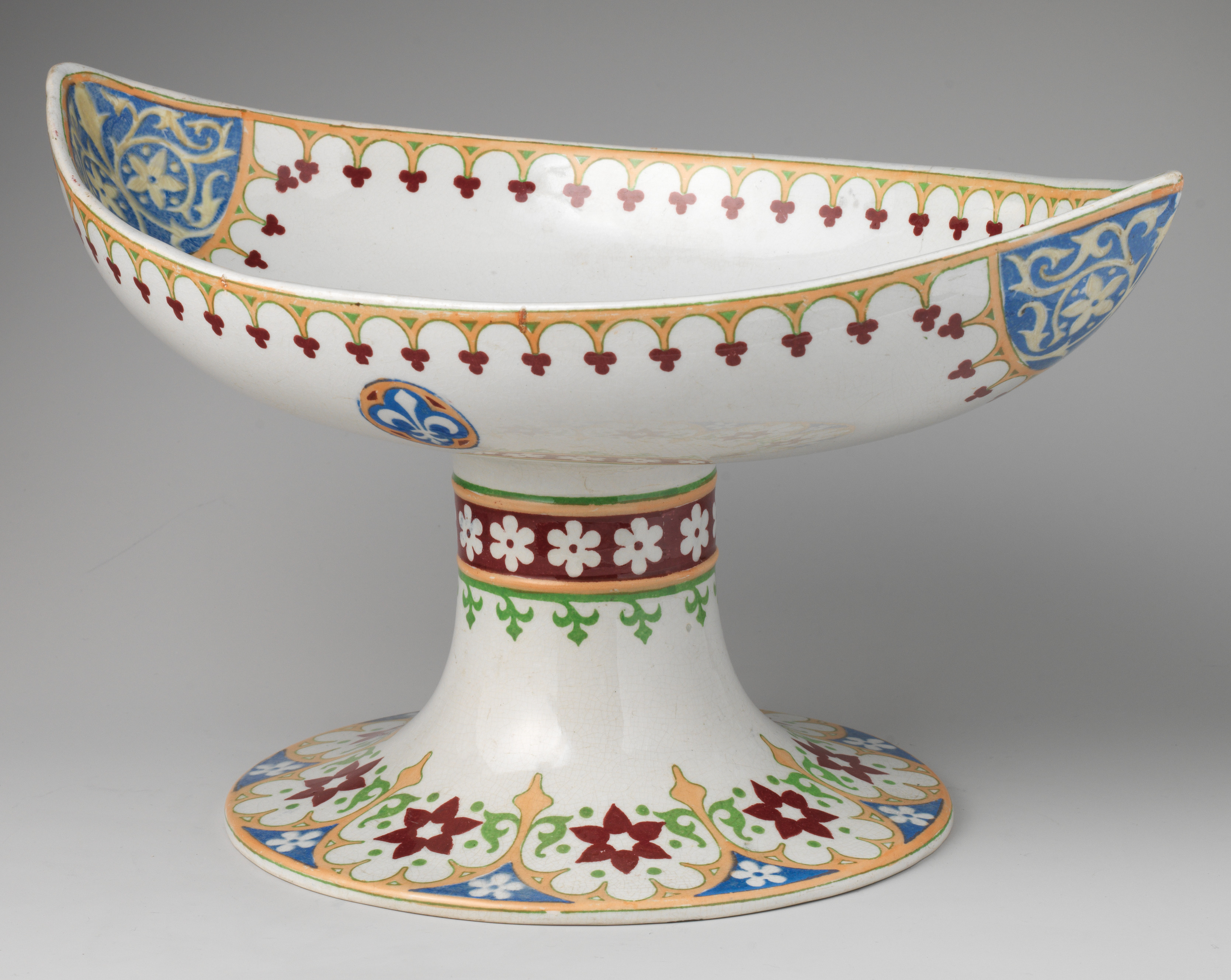
Gothic Revival by Augustus Pugin (not resembling in the slightest any actual medieval pottery); earthenware, 1850.

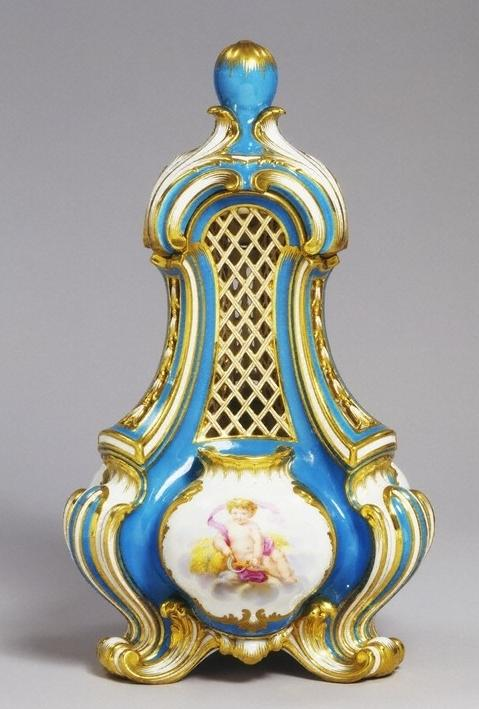
Vase with a bleu celeste ground, modelled after a Sèvres Rococo design, c. 1855

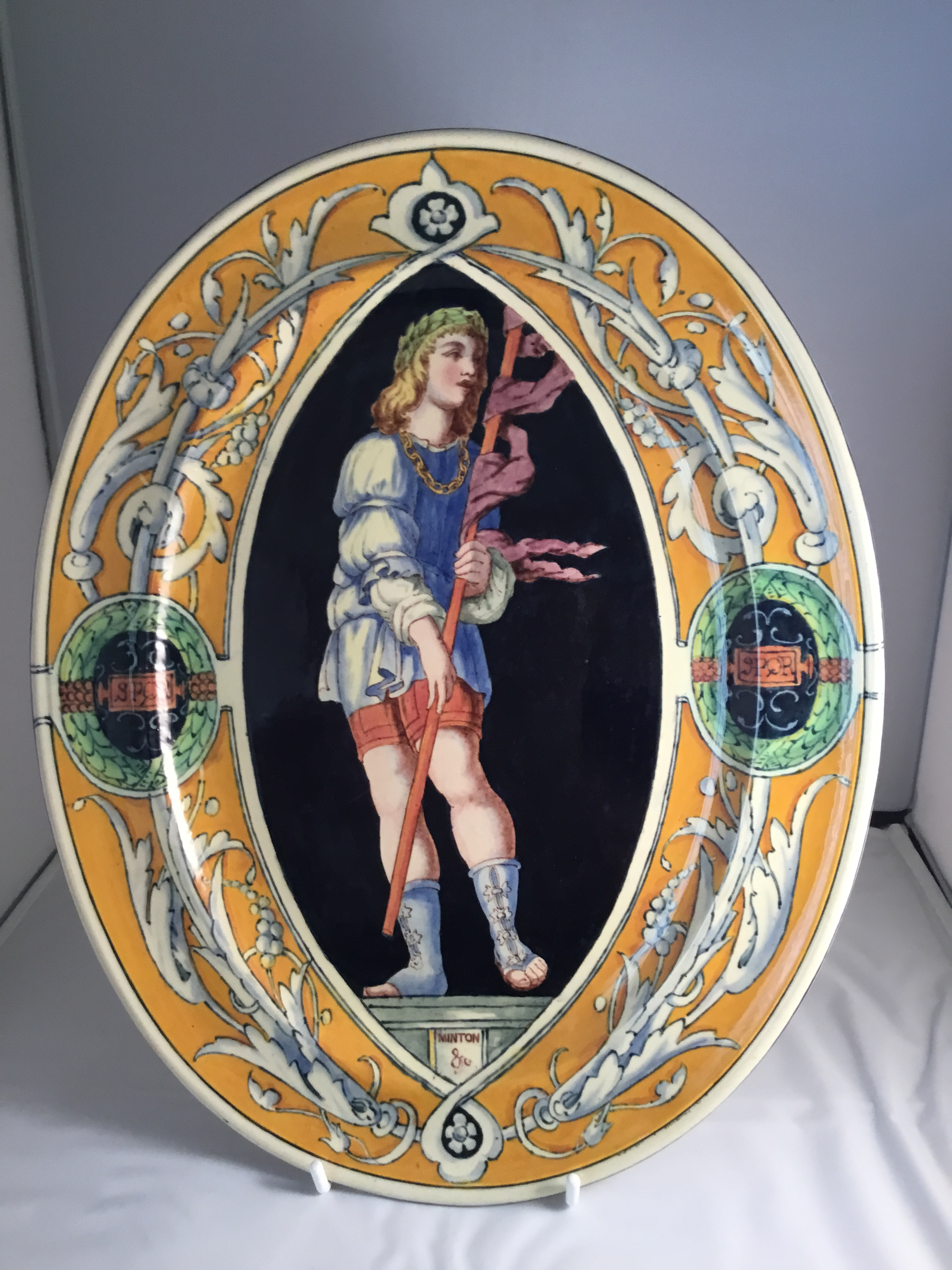
Tin-glazed maiolica plaque, c. 1860, the boy from Mantegna's Triumphs of Caesar

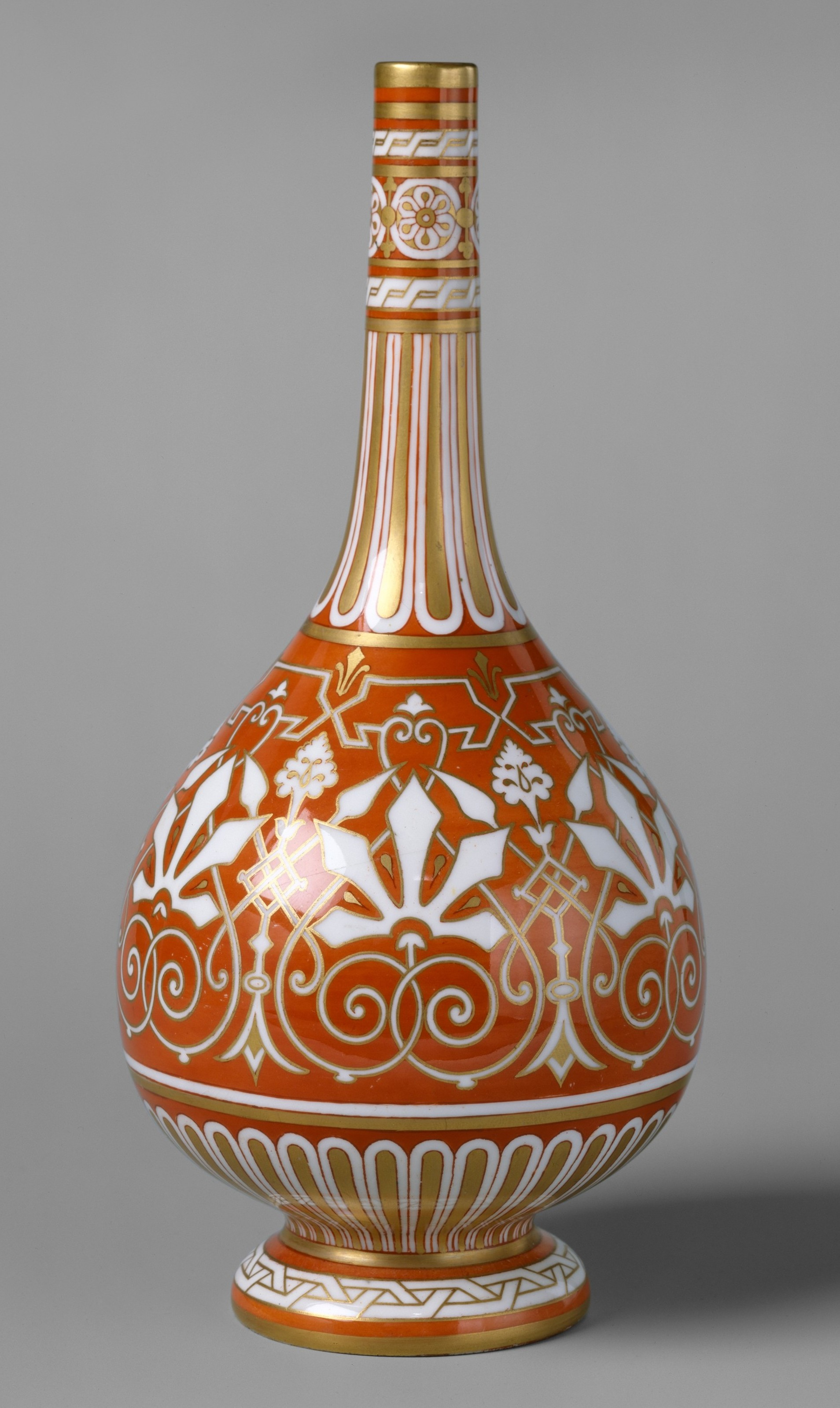
Persian bottle shape, c. 1862, design attributed to Christopher Dresser.

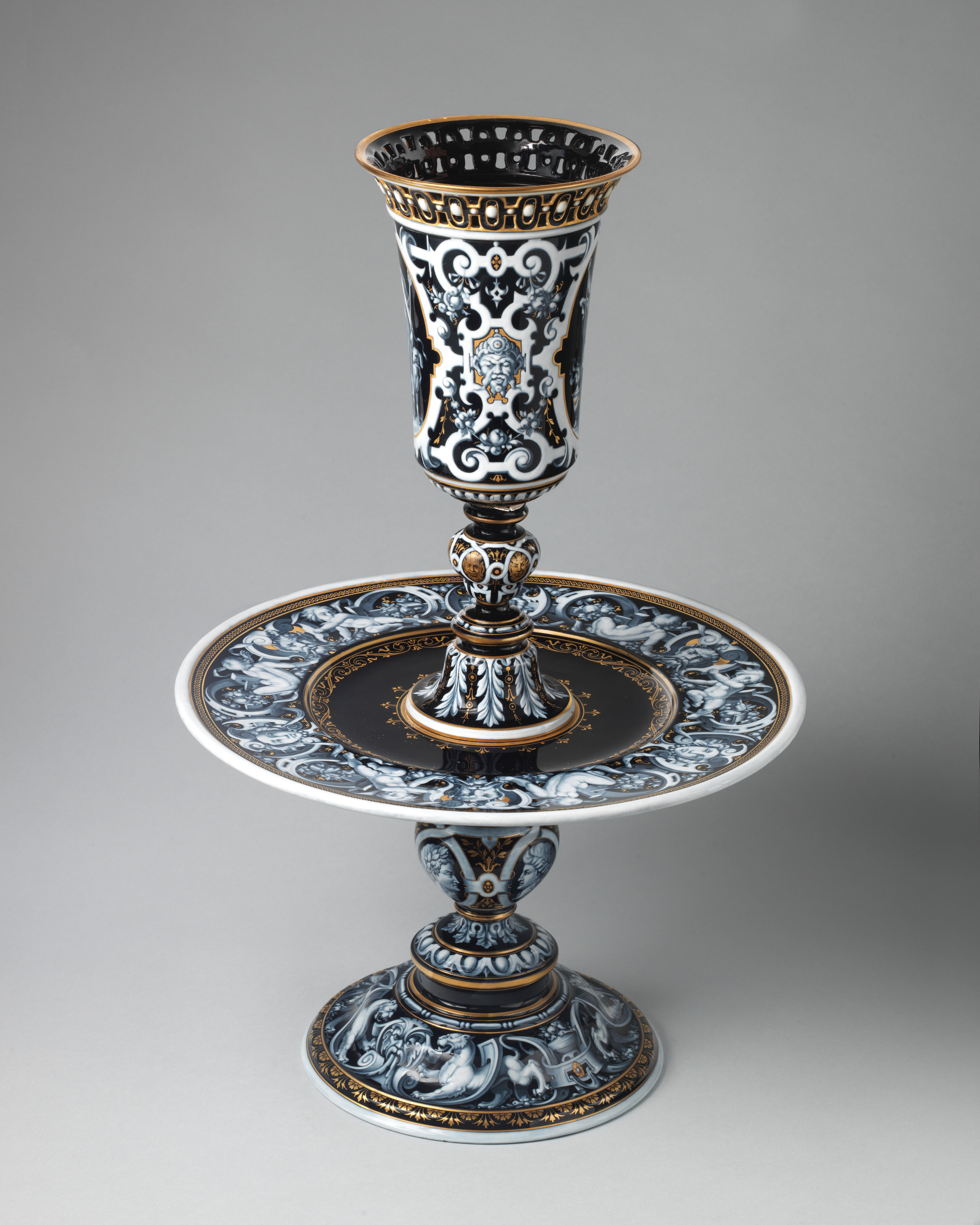
Porcelain centrepiece in the style of Renaissance Limoges enamel, 1866

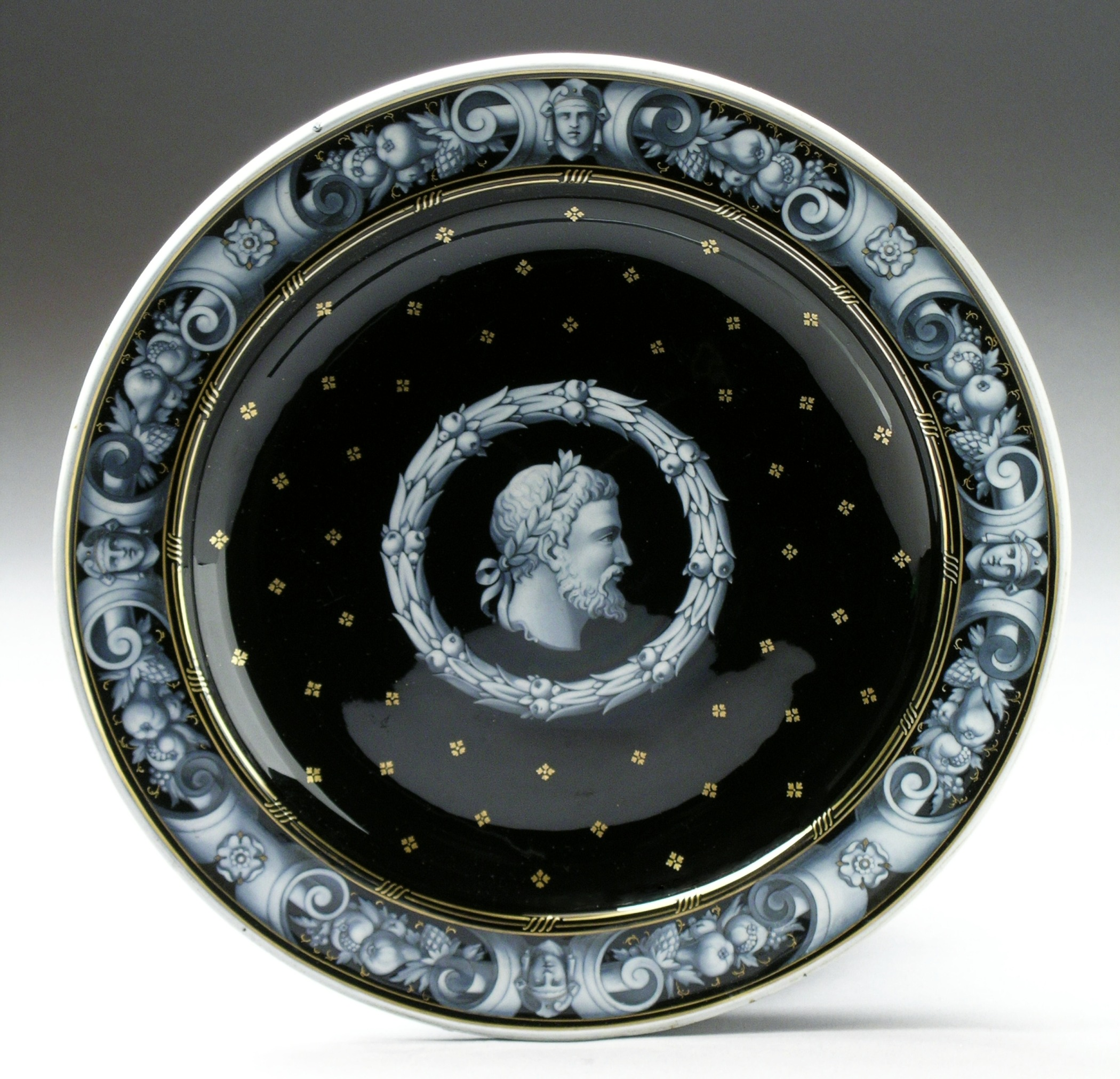
Porcelain plate in the style of Renaissance Limoges enamel, 1866, by Henry Stacy Marks

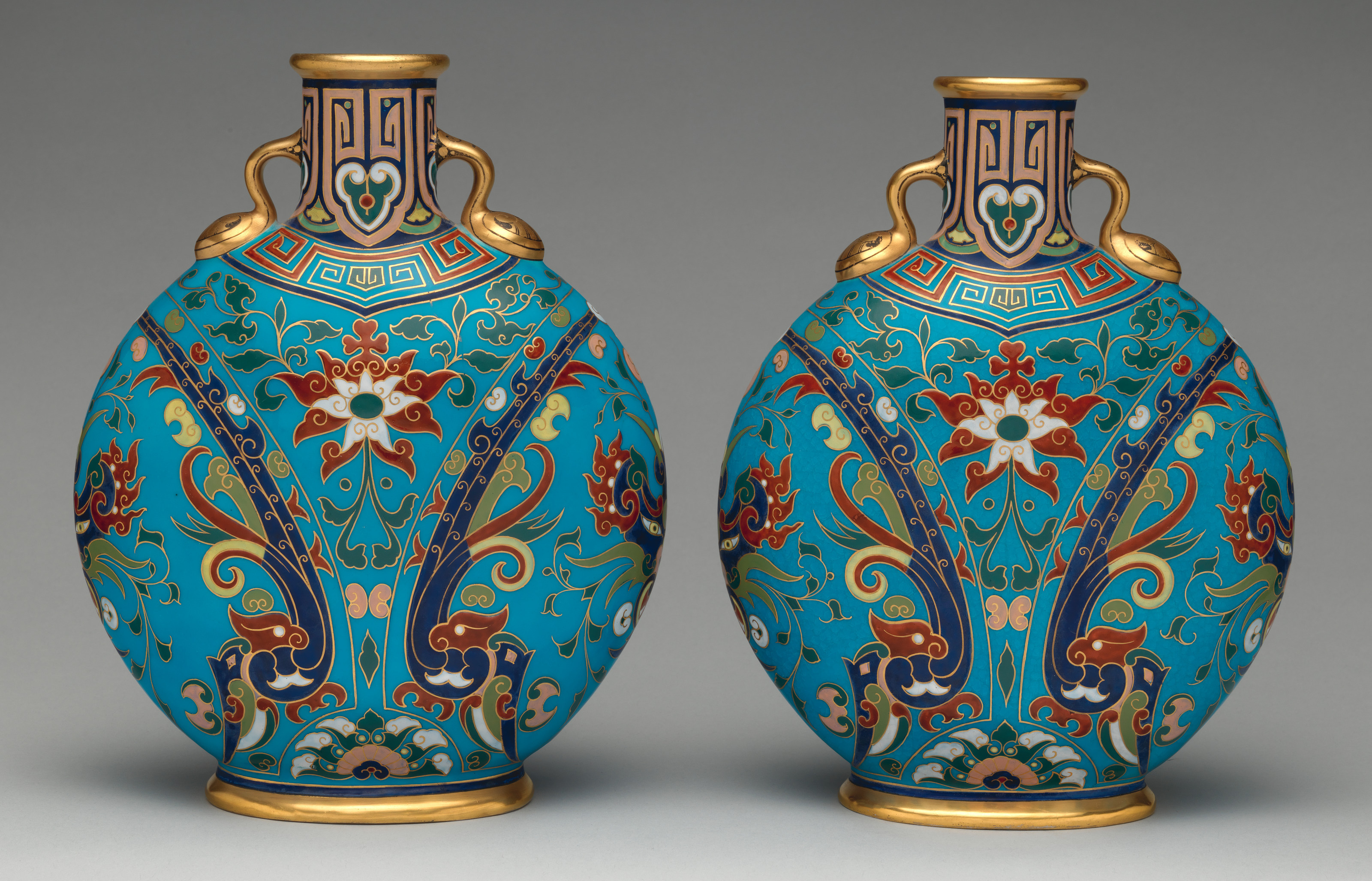
Pair of bottles in "Oriental" style, reminiscent of Chinese cloisonné enamel, 1870s, design attributed to Christopher Dresser.

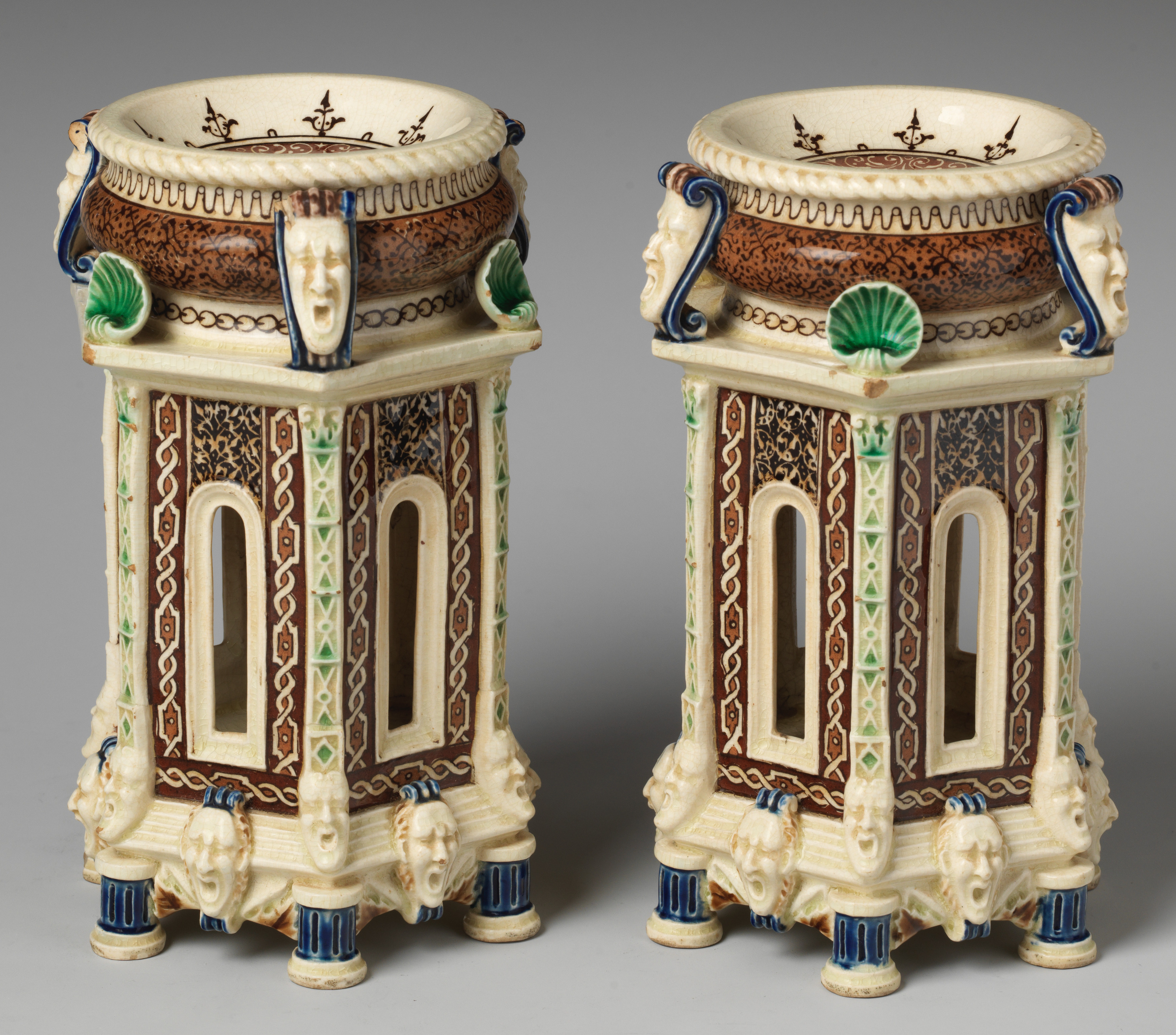
Pair of salts in "Henri Deux" or Saint-Porchaire ware style, by Charles Toft, in lead-glazed "majolica"

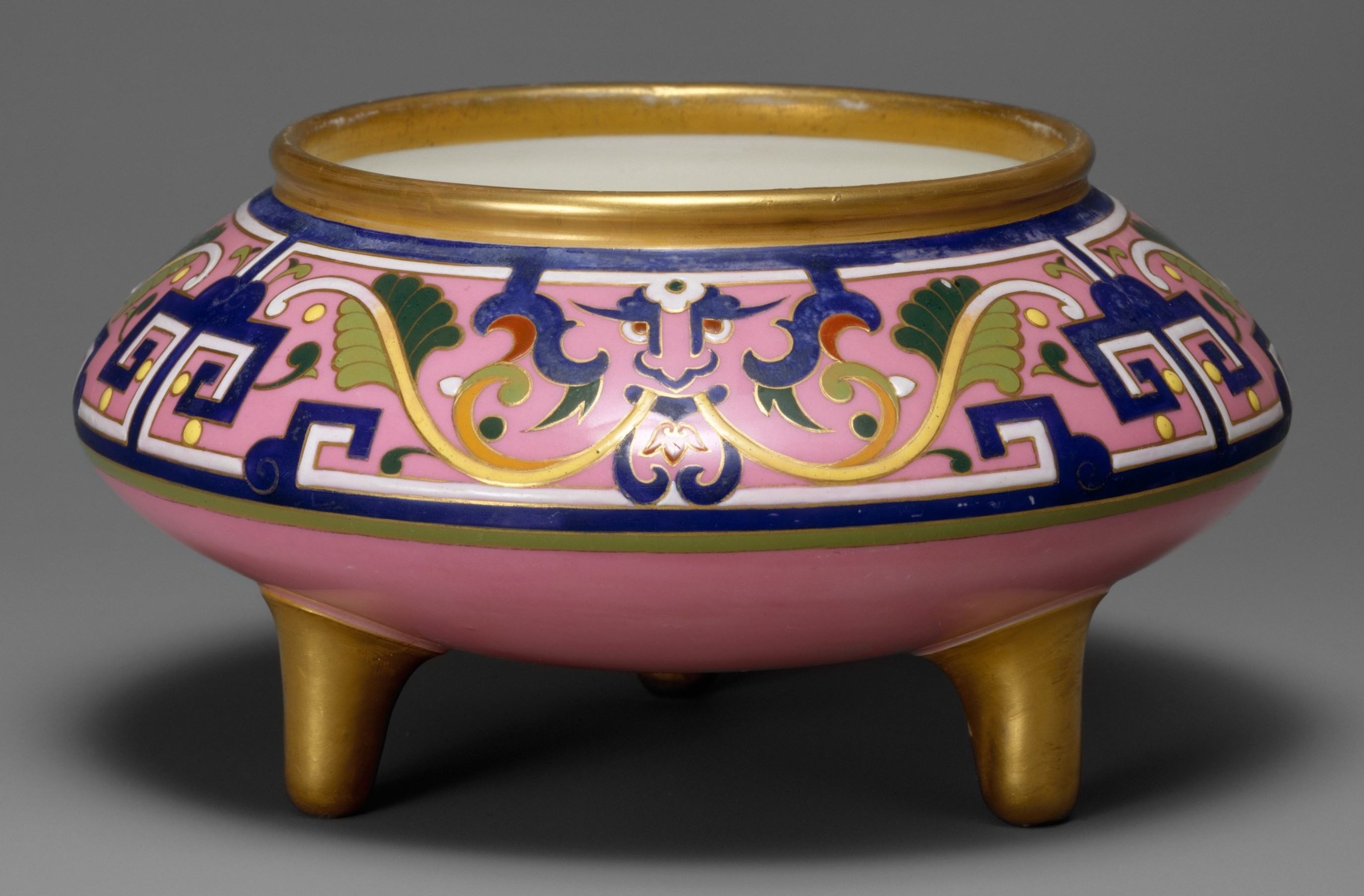
Oriental bowl, 1871, Christopher Dresser, with motifs from ancient Chinese ritual bronzes, in a "cloisonné ware" style.

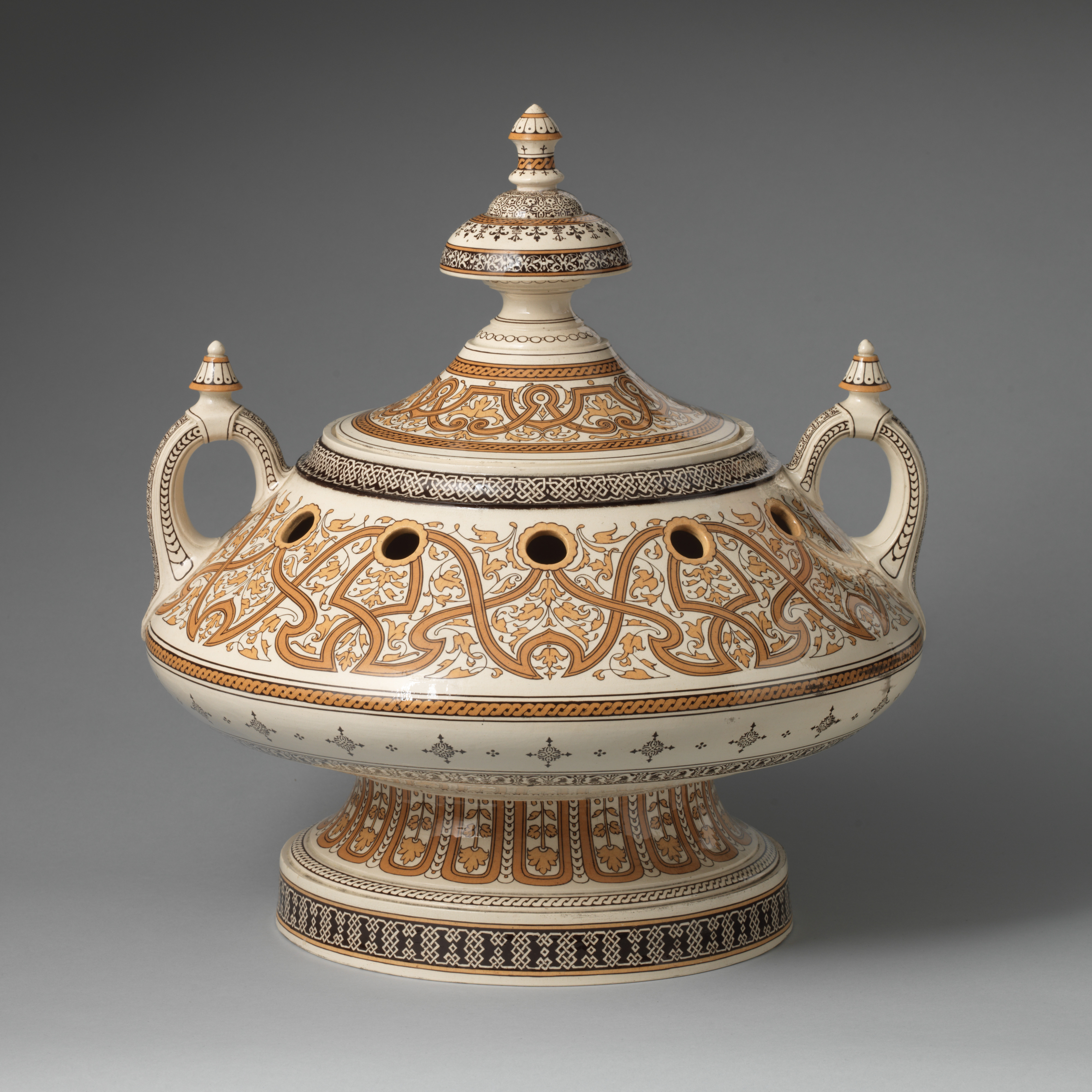
"Henri II ware" meets Islamic style in this pot-pourri vase by Charles Toft, 1871. This decoration is painted rather than inlaid.

The Franco-Prussian War of 1870 gave Arnoux the opportunity to recruit the modeller Marc-Louis Solon, who had developed the technique of pâte-sur-pâte at Sèvres and brought it with him to Minton. In this process the design is built up in relief with layers of liquid slip, with each layer being allowed to dry before the next is applied. There was great demand for Solon's plaques and vases, featuring maidens and cherubs, and Minton assigned him apprentices to help the firm become the unrivalled leader in this field.

Others introduced to Minton by Arnoux included the sculptor Albert-Ernest Carrier-Belleuse and the painter Antoine Boullemier.

In 1870 Mintons opened an art pottery studio in Kensington, London, directed by William Stephen Coleman and encouraged both amateur and professional artists to become involved in pottery decoration and design. This might be in hand-painted plaques, or in producing designs to be replicated in larger quantities in the Stoke factory. When the studio was destroyed by fire in 1875, it was not rebuilt.

Mid-Victorian painting, 1865–1880

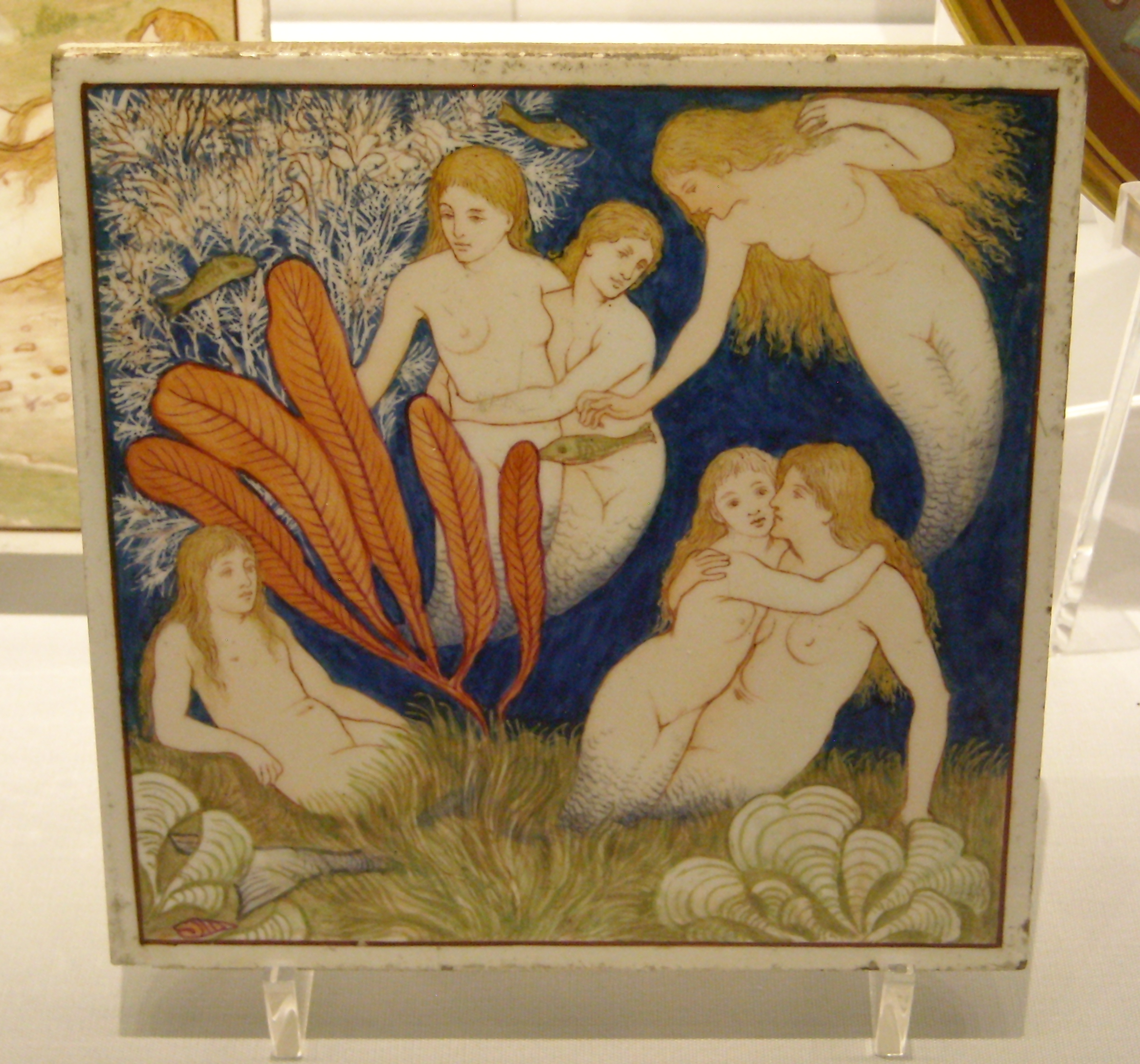
Mermaid tile, 1867, by Henry Holiday (1839–1927)

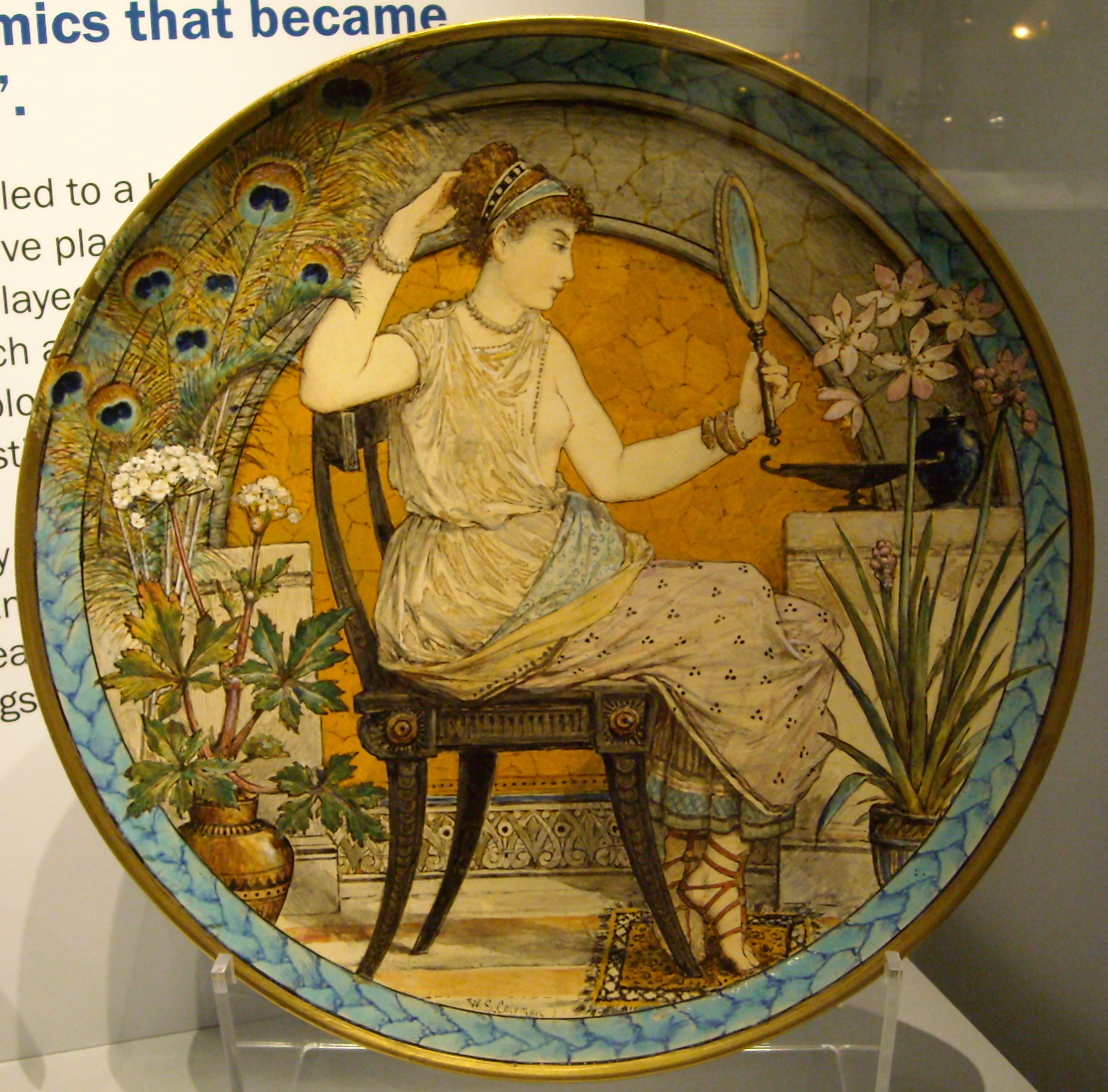
Plate, 1869, William Stephen Coleman (1829–1904)

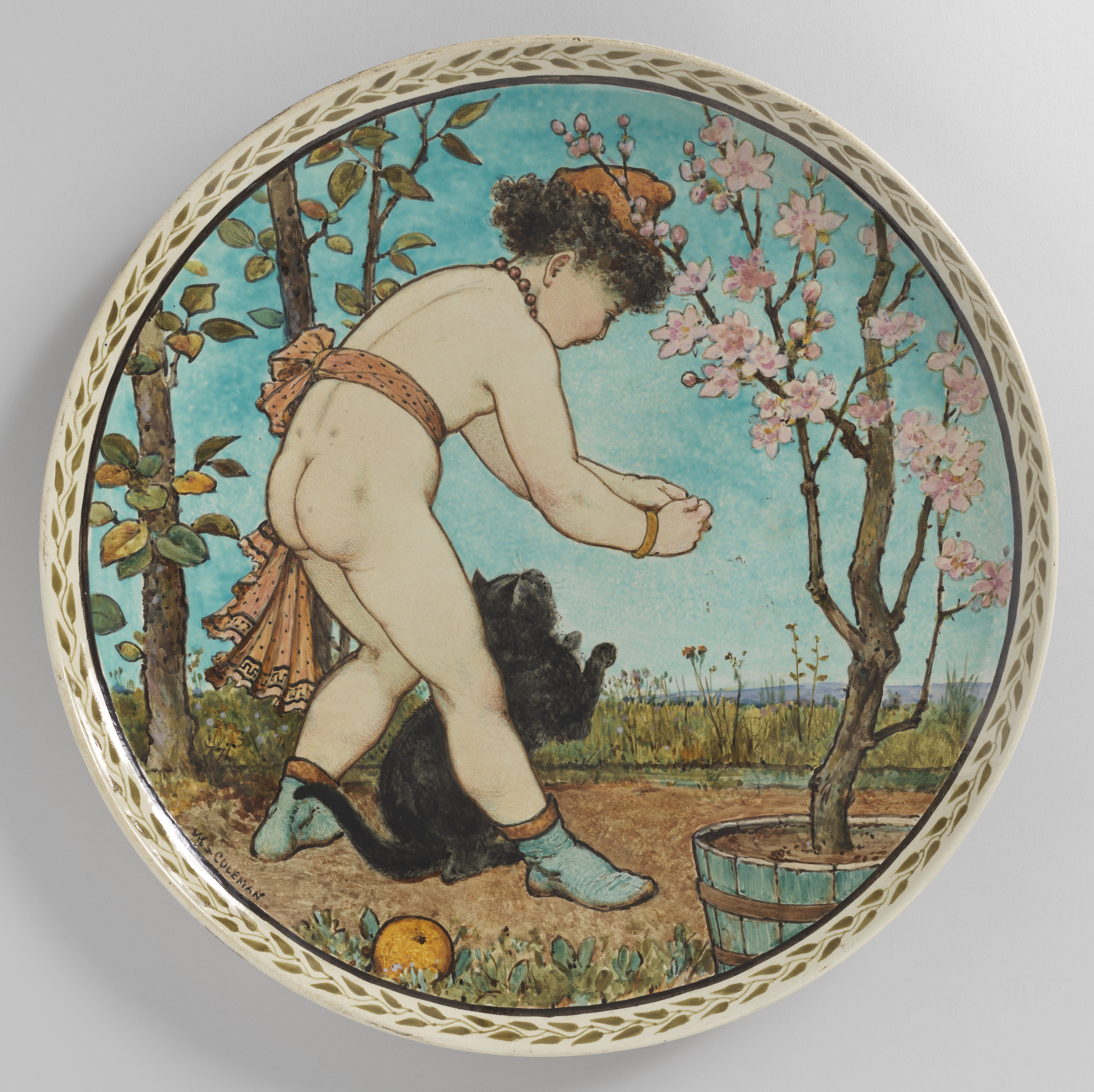
Platter by William Stephen Coleman, 1871

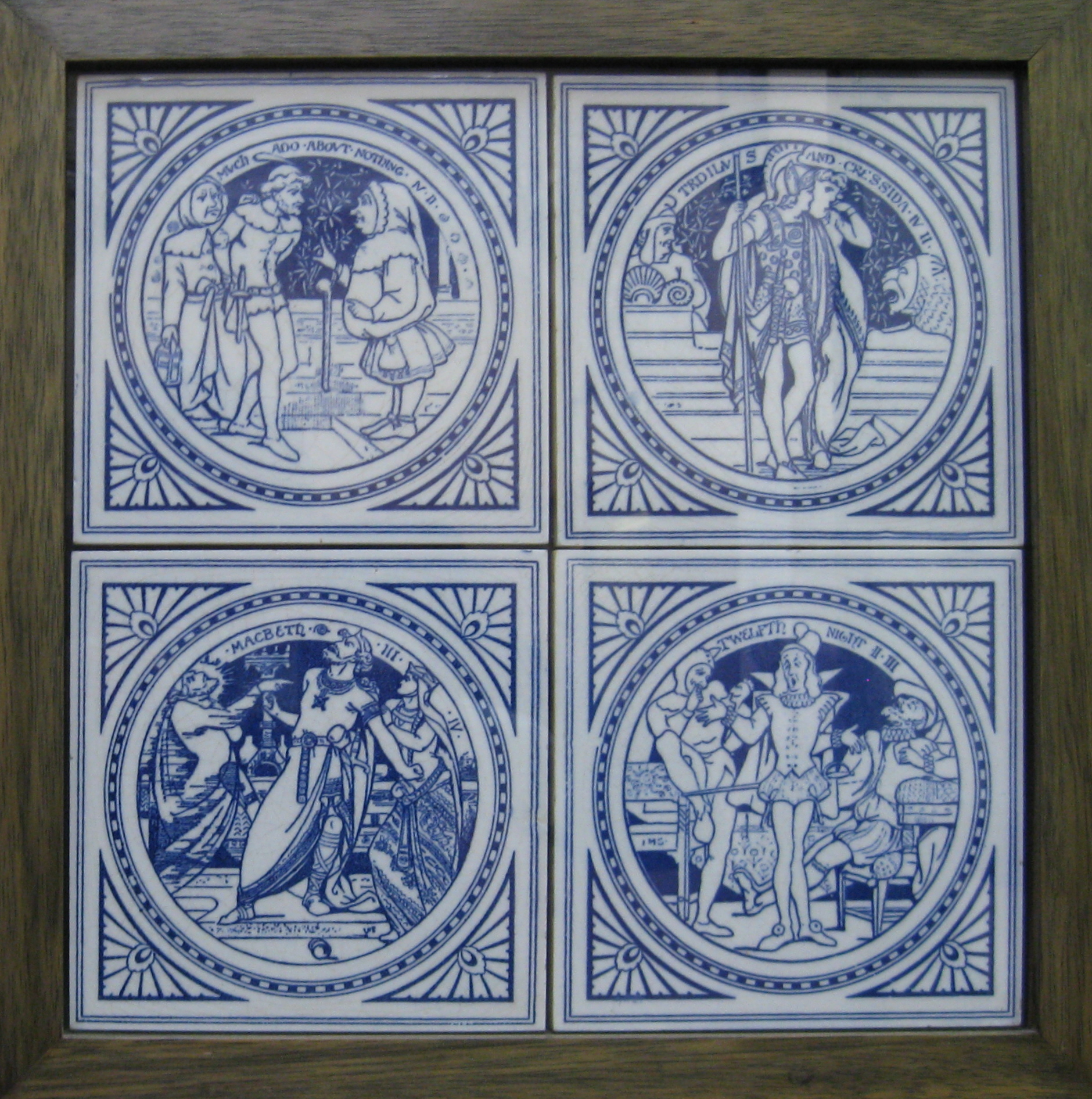
Printed Shakespeare tiles, 1872, designed by John Moyr Smith

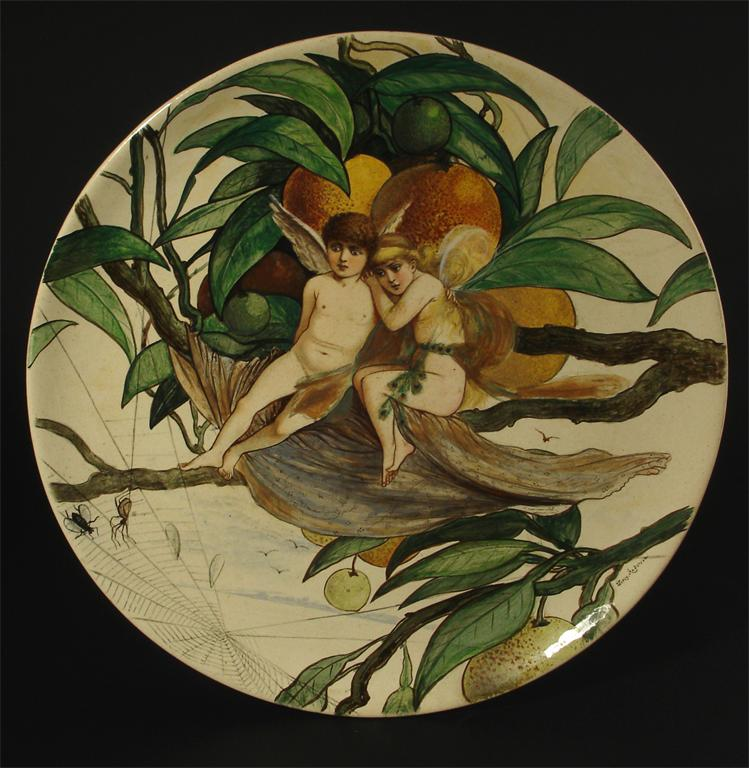
Plaque with fairies watching a spider, c. 1880 by Percy Anderson

=== Late Victorian and 20th century ===
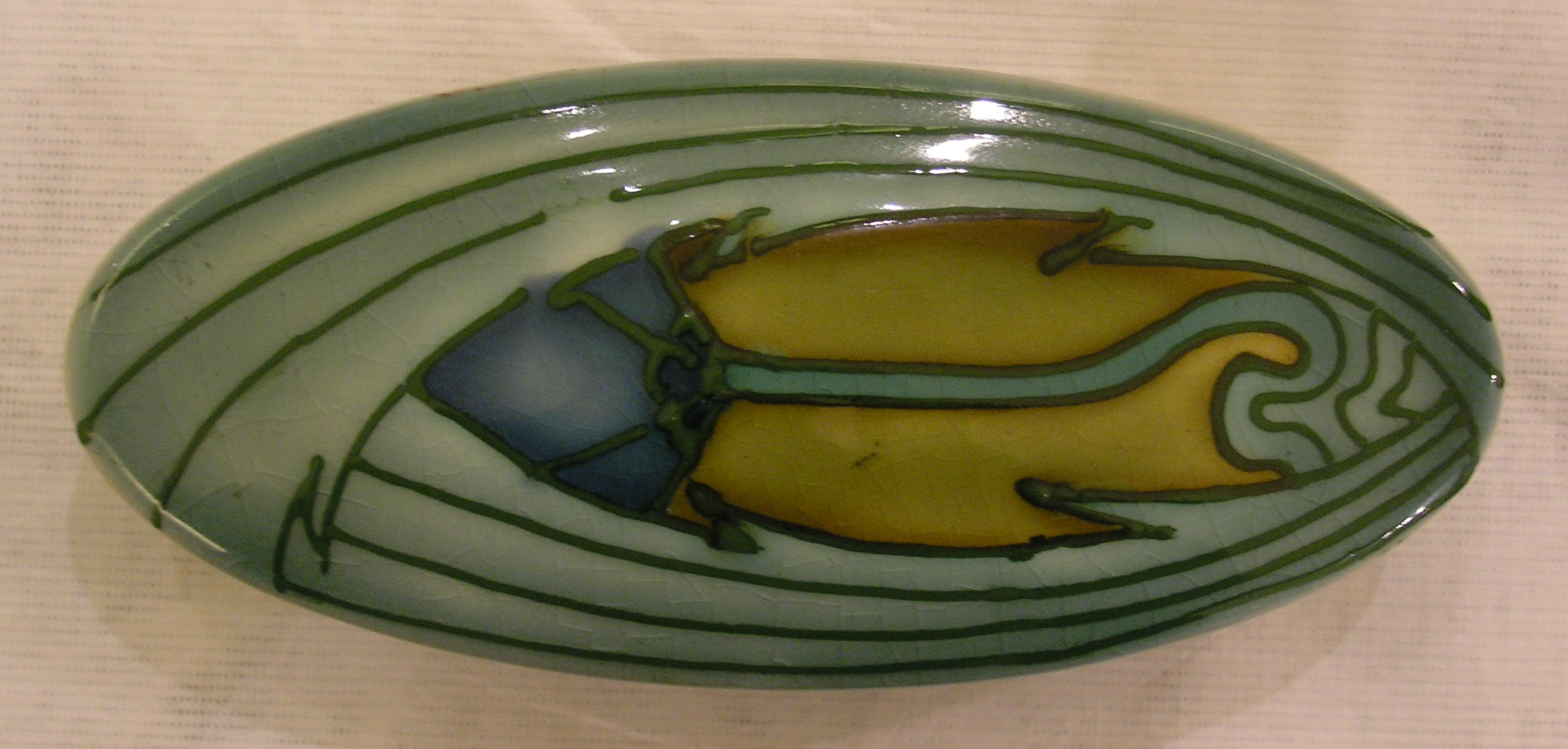
Top of Secessionist Ware box, 1906

From the mid-1890s onwards, Mintons made major contributions to Art Nouveau ceramics with a fine range of slip-trailed majolica ware, many designed by Marc-Louis Solon's son Leon Solon and his colleague John Wadsworth. Leon Solon was hired by Mintons after his work was published in the hugely influential design magazine The Studio and he worked for the company from 1895 to 1905, including a brief stint as Art Director. Solon introduced designs influenced by the Vienna Secession art movement, founded by Gustav Klimt and others, and a range in earthenware made from about 1901 to 1916 was branded as "Secessionist Ware". It was made mostly using industrial techniques that kept it relatively cheap, and was aimed at a broad market. The range concentrated on items bought singly or in pairs, such as jugs or vases, rather than full table services.

The Secessionist range covered both practical and ornamental wares including cheese dishes, plates, teapots, jugs and comports, vases and large jardinières. The shapes of ornamental vases included inverted trumpets, elongated cylinders and exaggerated bottle forms, although tableware shapes were conventional. Early Secessionist patterns featured realistic renderings of natural motifs—flowers, birds and human figures—but under the combined influence of Solon and Wadsworth, these became increasingly exaggerated and stylised, with the characteristic convoluted plant forms and floral motifs reaching extravagant heights.

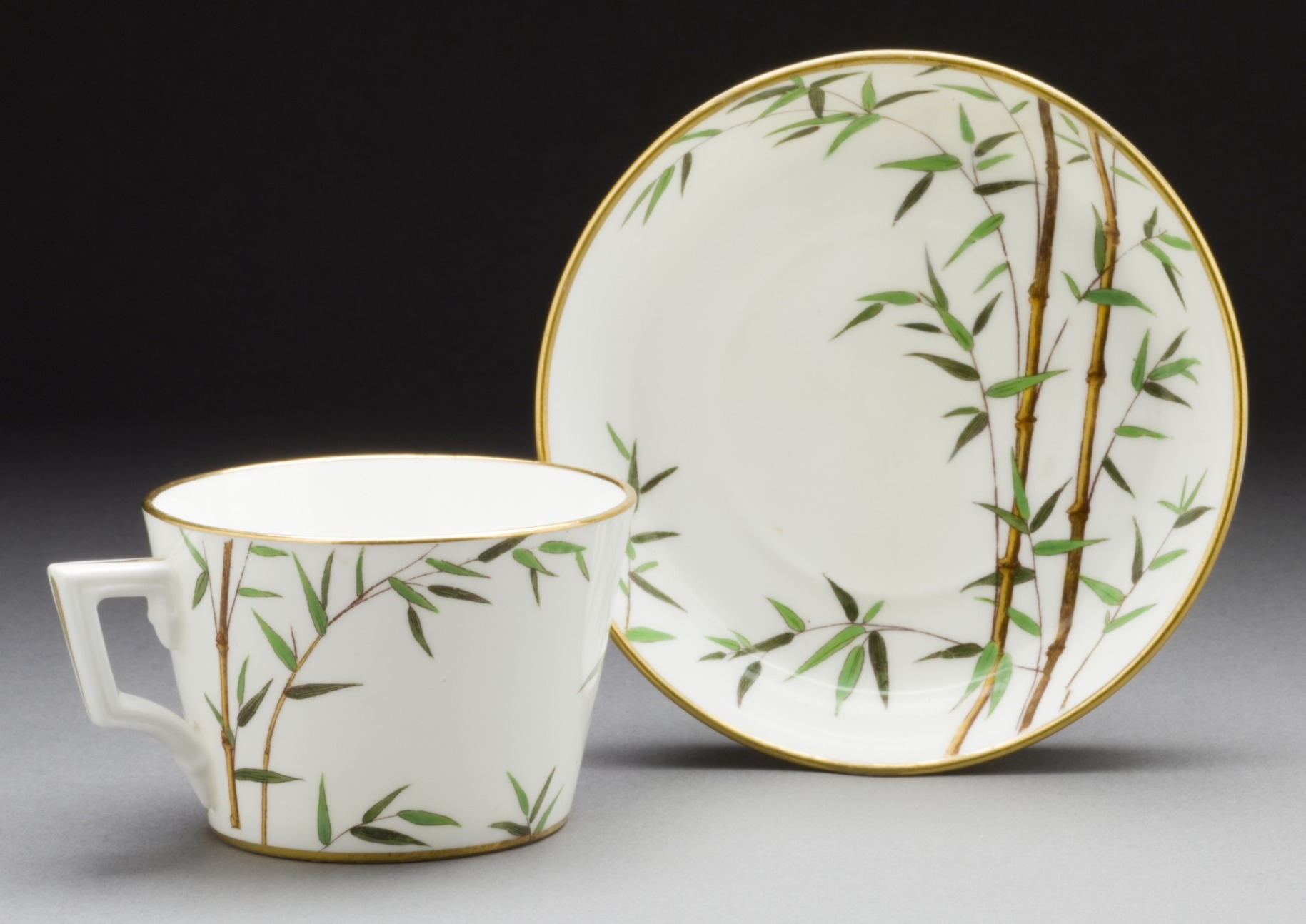
"Bamboo" pattern, by Christopher Dresser, porcelain, 1875

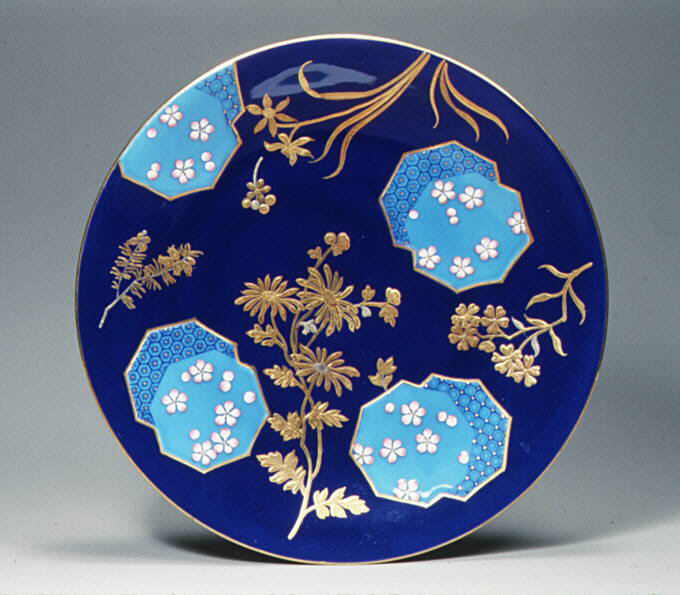
Porcelain plate influenced by Japonisme, 1881

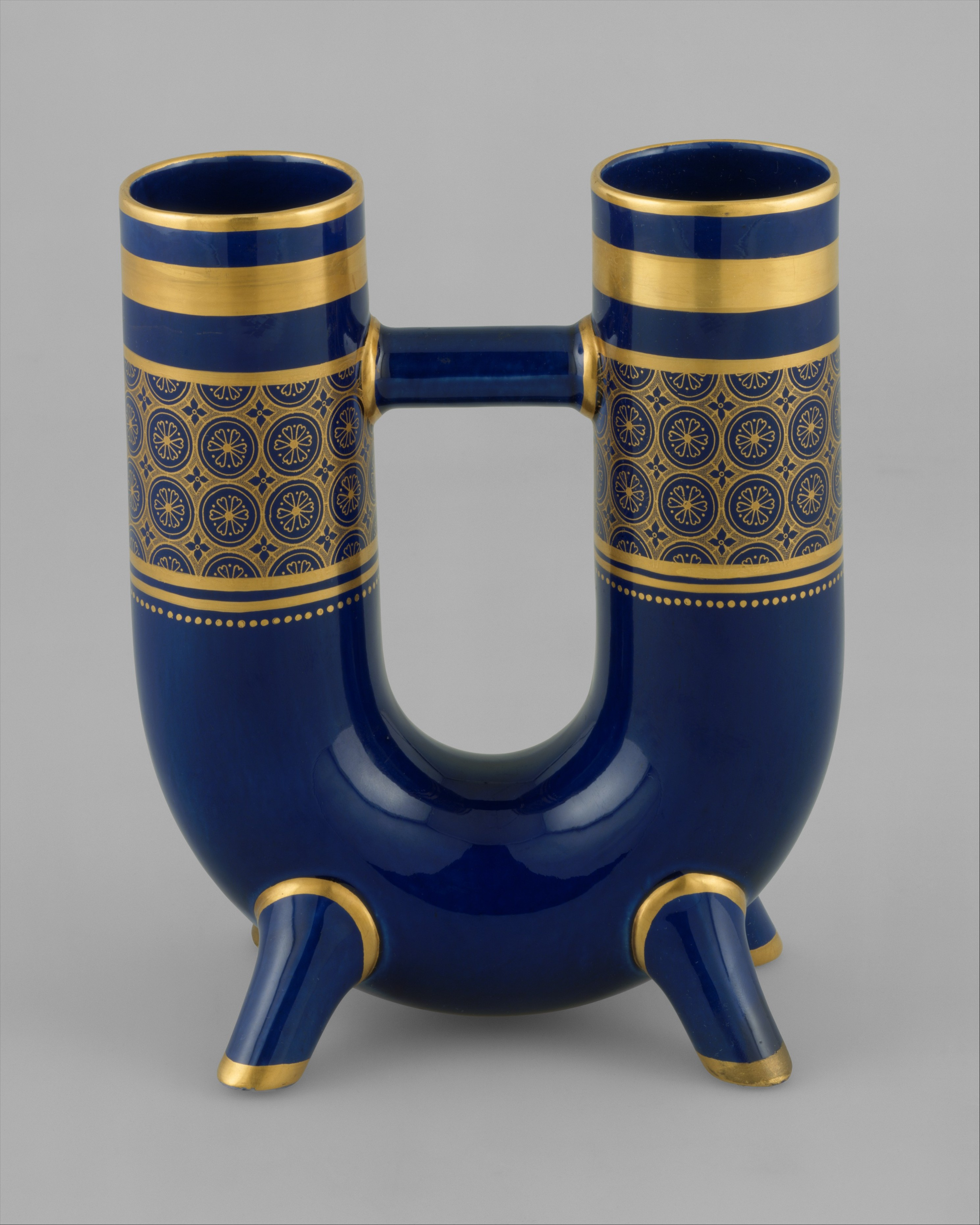
U-shaped vase by Christopher Dresser, porcelain, 1886 or 1889

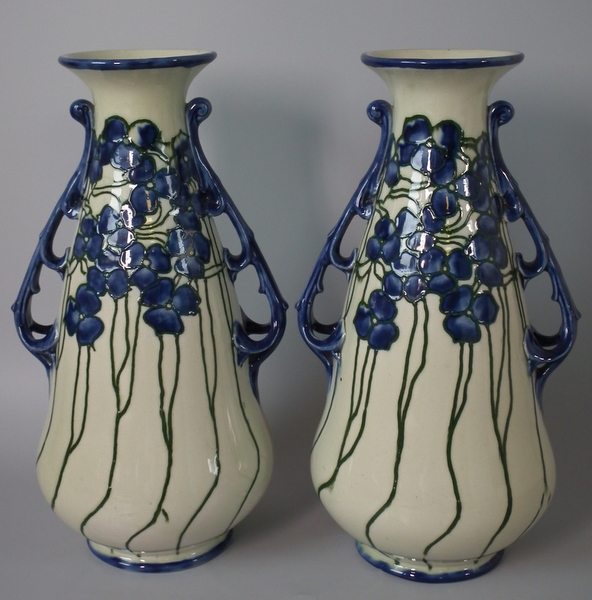
Secessionist vases

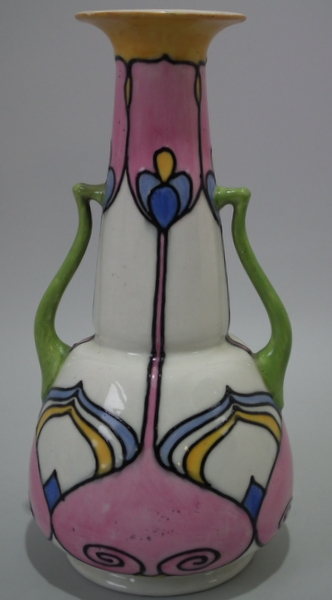
Secessionist vase

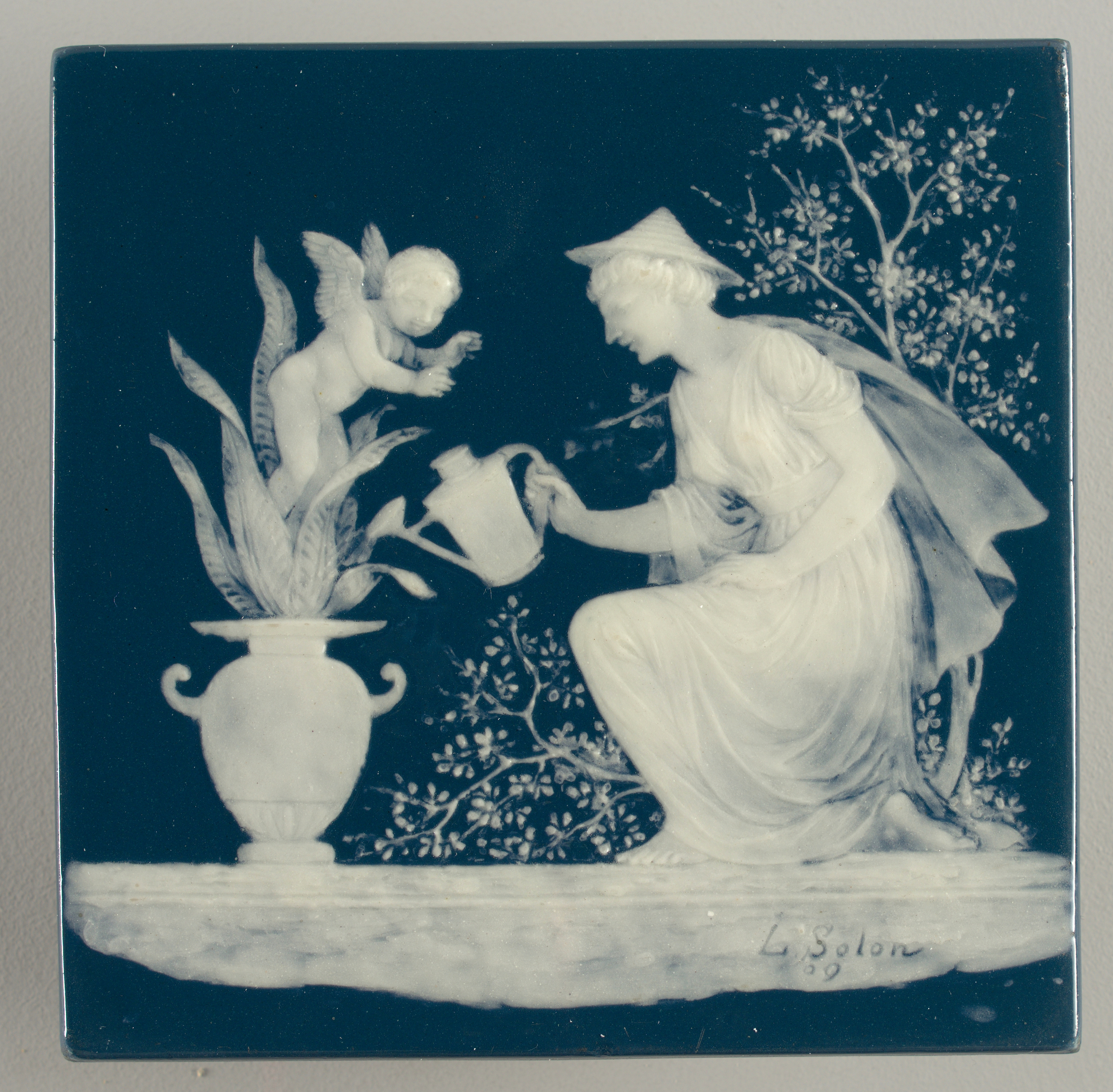
Plaque, perhaps 1909, porcelain with pâte-sur-pâte, a late work by Marc-Louis Solon.

"Secessionist Ware" was arguably the last boldly innovative move made by Mintons in terms of design. After World War I wares became rather more conventional. The Minton factory in the centre of Stoke was rebuilt and modernised after World War II by the then managing director, J. E. Hartill, a great-great-great-grandson of Thomas Minton. But the firm shared in the overall decline of the Staffordshire pottery industry in the post-war period. The tableware division was always the mainstay of Minton's fortunes and the post-1950 rationalisation of the British pottery industry took Mintons into a merger with Royal Doulton Tableware Ltd. By the 1980s Mintons was only producing a few different shapes but still employed highly skilled decorators.

== Legacy ==
=== Minton Archive ===
The Minton Archive comprises papers and drawings of the designs, manufacture and production of Mintons. It was acquired by Waterford Wedgwood in 2005 along with other assets of the Royal Doulton group. At one time it seemed the archive would become part of the Wedgwood Museum collection. In the event, the archive was presented by the Art Fund to the City of Stoke-on-Trent, but it was envisaged that some material would be displayed at Barlaston as well as the Potteries Museum and Art Gallery.

=== Buildings ===
The main factory on London Road, Stoke-on-Trent, was demolished in the 1990s, and the other factory, including office accommodation and a Minton Museum, was demolished in 2002 as part of rationalisation within the Royal Doulton group. Royal Doulton was taken over in turn by the Waterford Wedgwood group in January 2005. As a result of these changes, the ceramics collection formerly in the Minton Museum was partly dispersed. On the other hand, the Minton Archive has been kept together with help from the Art Fund, being transferred to the City of Stoke-on-Trent in 2015.

The Victorian building on Shelton Old Road, Stoke, which used to be the Minton Hollins tileworks is on a separate site from the former Minton pottery. It was threatened with demolition in the 1980s but was listed in 1986 and has been preserved.
