= Minton (surname) =

Minton is a surname of British origin. It is a locational surname, named after Minton, Shropshire, which in Old English means "the settlement on the hill". The surname Minton may refer to:

- Anna Minton (born 1970), British writer
- John W. "Big John Studd" Minton (born 1948–1995), Professional Wrestler
- Bob Minton (1946–2010), American banker
- Chip Minton (born 1969), American bobsledder
- Clive Minton (1934–2019), Australian ornithologist
- Faith Minton (born 1957), American actress and stuntwoman
- Greg Minton (born 1951), American baseball player
- Gytte Minton (1901–1964), British fencer
- Henry A. Minton (1883–1948), American architect
- Henry Collin Minton (1855–1924), American theologian
- Jeff Minton (born 1973), British football player
- John D. Minton Jr. (born 1952), American judge
- John Minton (artist) (1917–1957), British painter
- Mark C. Minton (born 1944), American diplomat
- Phil Minton (born 1940), British musician
- Rachel Minton (born 1980), American musician
- Reggie Minton (born 1941), American basketball coach
- Rick Minton (born 1950), American politician
- Sherman A. Minton (1919–1999), American scientist
- Sherman Minton (1890–1965), American politician and judge
- Robert Minton (cricketer)
- Robert Minton (bobsleigh) (1904–1974), American bobsledder
- Roy Minton, British playwright
- Roy Minton (born 1967), American author
- Thomas Minton (1765–1836), British potter
- Tom Minton (born 1954), American animator and artist
- Yvonne Minton (born 1938), Australian opera singer

== See also ==
- Manton (disambiguation)
- Mountain (surname)
