= Spode (disambiguation) =

Spode is a company producing pottery and porcelain in Staffordshire, England.

Spode may also refer to:

- Josiah Spode (1733–1797), renowned English potter, founder of the Spode company
- Spode Museum, dedicated to the Spode company, located in Stoke-on-Trent, England
- Hasso Spode (born 1951), German historian and sociologist
- Roderick Spode, an amateur fascist dictator in the stories of P. G. Wodehouse
- Spode, a fictional god from the game Spore
