= Thomas Minton =

British engraver and potter

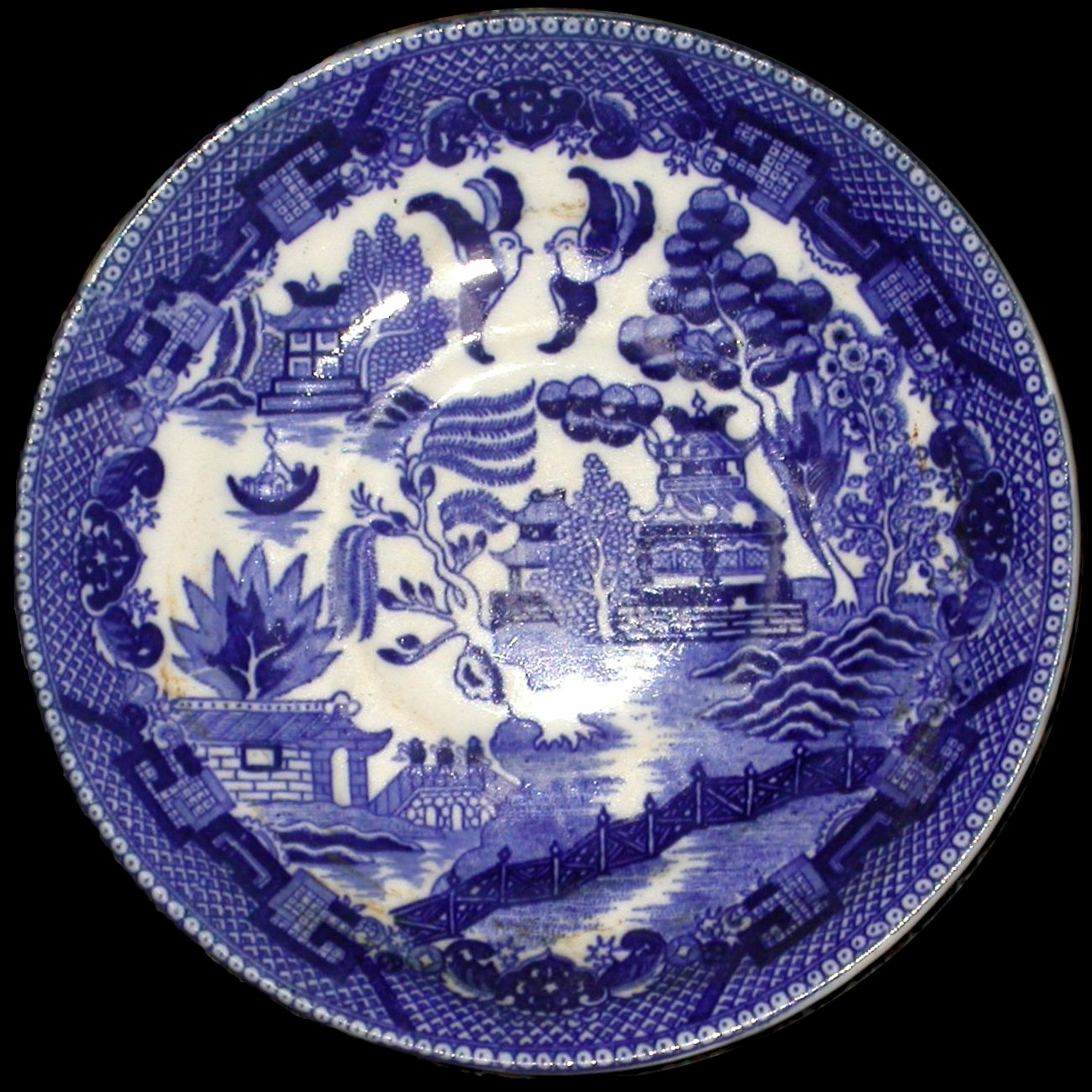
A 20th century version of The Willow Pattern, a typical Staffordshire Potteries product in blue and white transfer printed earthenware.

Thomas Minton (1765–1836) was an English potter. He founded Thomas Minton & Sons in Stoke-on-Trent, Staffordshire, which grew into a major ceramic manufacturing company with an international reputation.

During the early 1780s Thomas Minton was an apprentice engraver at the Caughley Pottery Works in Shropshire, under the proprietorship of Thomas Turner, working on copperplate engravings for the production of transferware. The engraver Thomas Lucas went from there to work for Josiah Spode at Stoke-on-Trent in 1783, taking some elements of the fashionable chinoiserie patterns with him. While at Caughley Thomas Minton is thought to have worked on chinoiserie landscape patterns including willows, and to have prepared copperplates of them: but the Salopian works never produced the standard willow pattern which includes the bridge and the fence in the foreground.

Minton left the Caughley works in 1785, and married his wife, Sarah, in London in 1789. In 1793 he established his own pottery factory in Stoke-upon-Trent principally for the manufacture of white-glazed earthen tablewares or pearlware including blue transfer printed and painted wares. Variations of his willow and other designs were acquired by Spode and other factories, and it was in this context that the English willow pattern was created. He was favoured and employed by Josiah Spode, for whom he engraved a new version of the pattern. To Minton is also attributed the popular 'Buffalo' pattern engraved for Spode. He was assisted by Henry Doncaster of Penkhull: his pupil William Greatbatch (father of William Greatbatch (1802–1885), another notable engraver) became chief engraver for Spode and for the successor company, Copeland's.

In c. 1796 Minton went into partnership with Joseph Poulson, who produced ornamental bone china at a factory nearby, and from c.1798 Minton employed Poulson's factory for his own china wares. After Poulson's death in 1808 he continued china production there until 1816. In 1824 he built a new factory for china, on the basis of which the company of 'Thomas Minton and Sons', known more simply as 'Mintons', was developed. At his death in 1836 his son Herbert Minton (1793–1858) continued and redeveloped the business.

His portrait was made by James Northcote, R.A.
