= Willow pattern =

Chinese-style pattern used on pottery

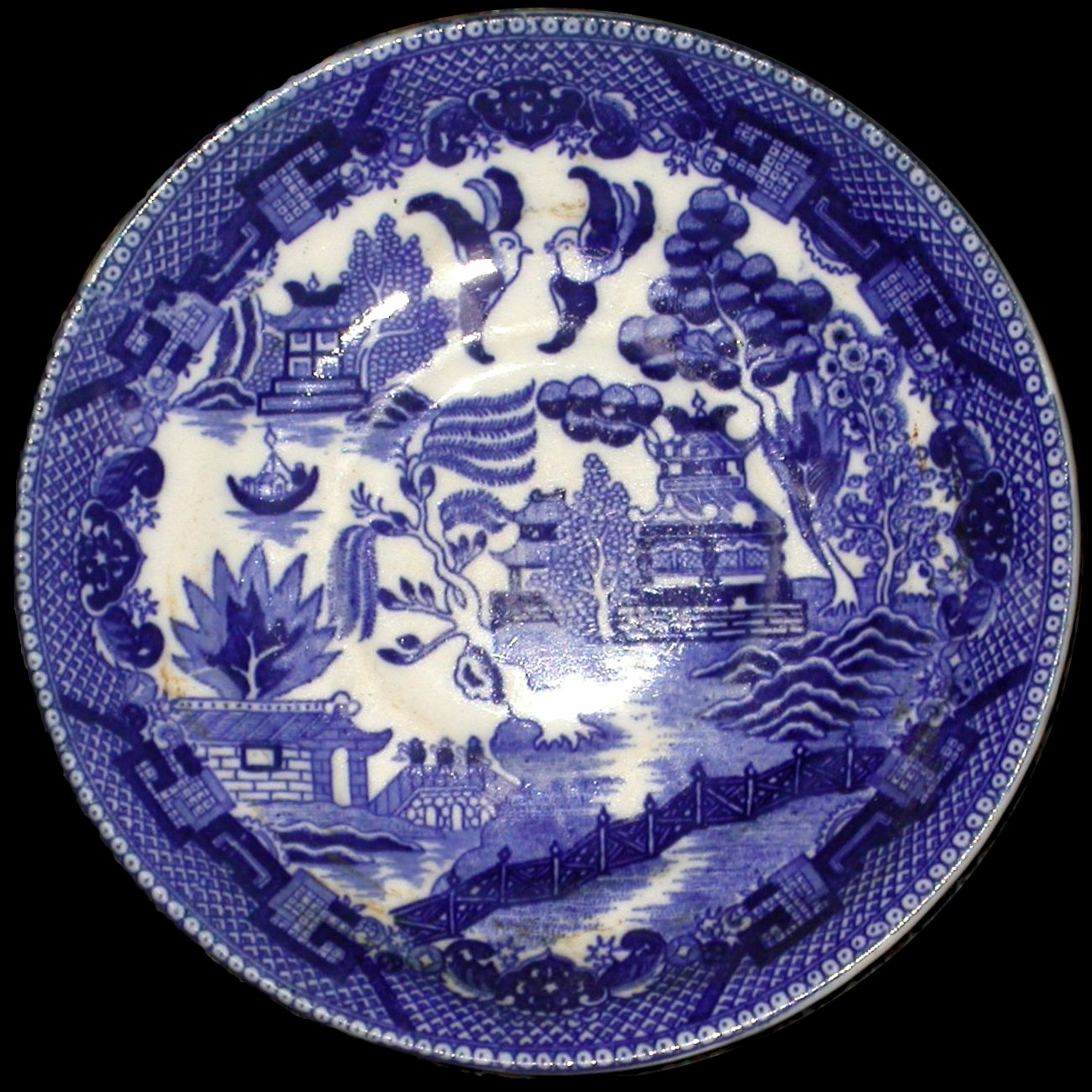
The Willow pattern

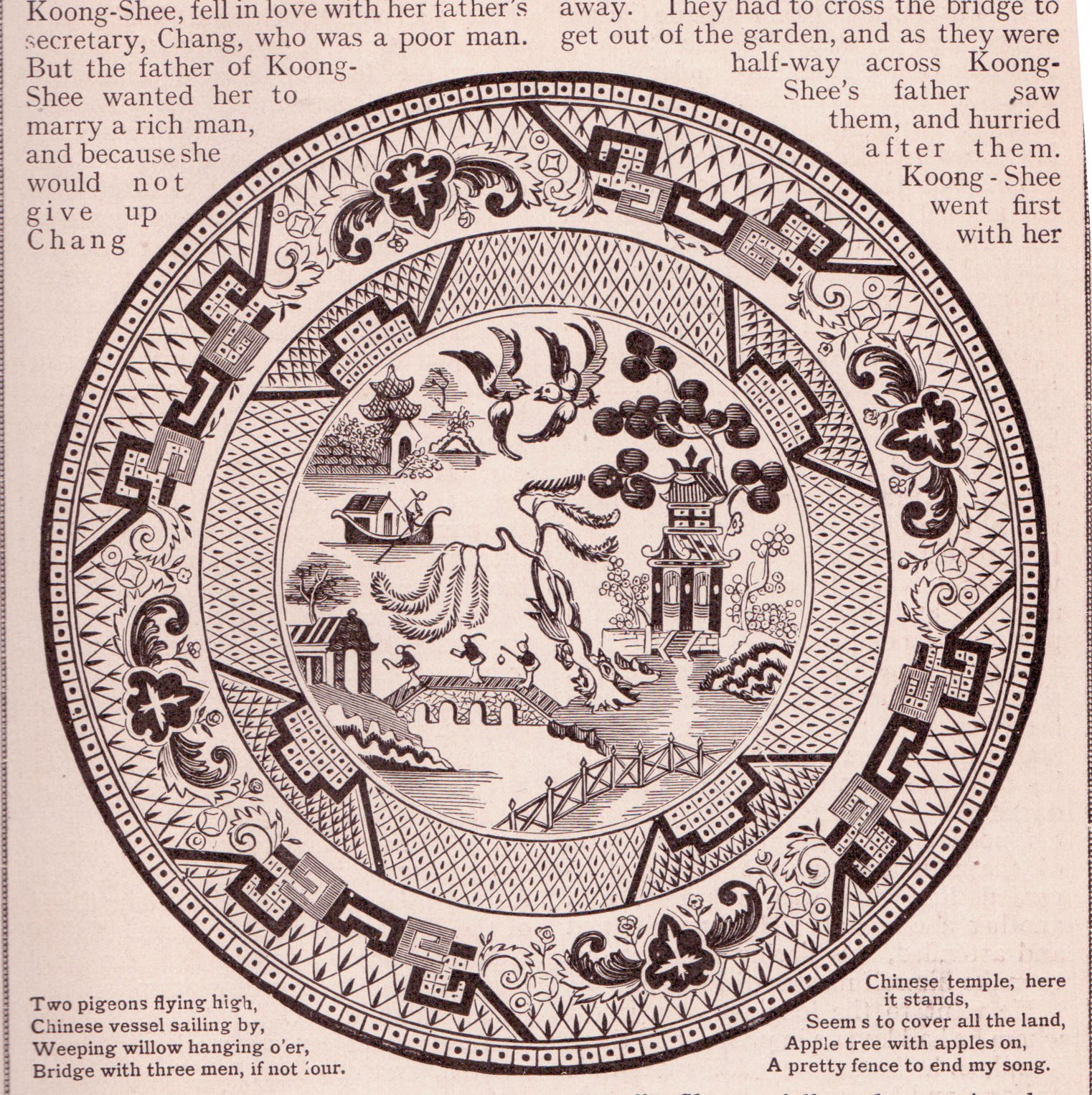
Illustration of the Willow pattern (1917).

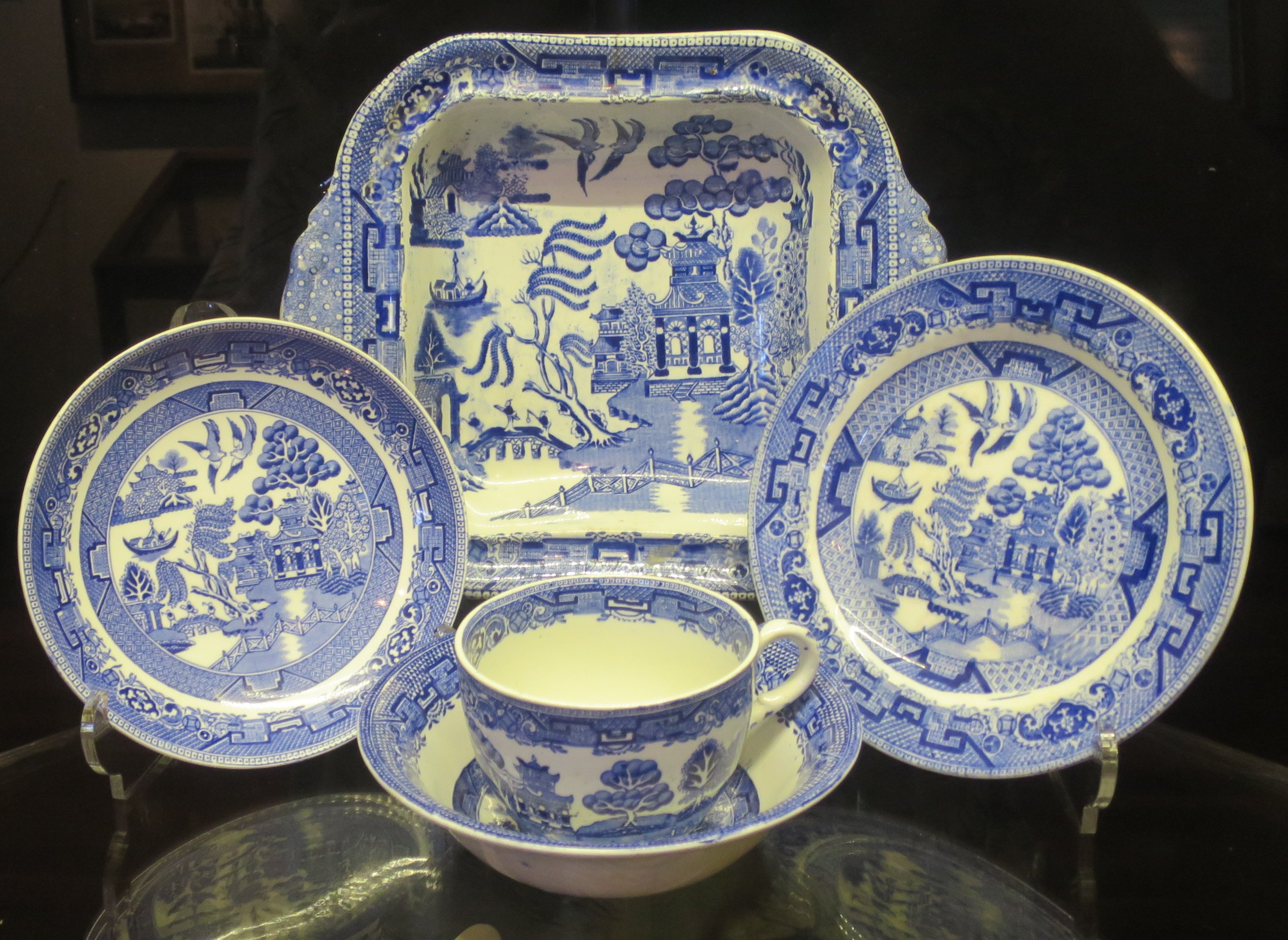
Different shapes in a Willow pattern, 19th century

The Willow pattern is a distinctive and elaborate chinoiserie pattern used on ceramic tableware. It became popular at the end of the 18th century in England when, in its standard form, it was developed by English ceramic artists combining and adapting motifs inspired by fashionable hand-painted blue-and-white wares imported from Qing dynasty China. Its creation occurred at a time when mass-production of decorative tableware, at Stoke-on-Trent and elsewhere, was already making use of engraved and printed glaze transfers, rather than hand-painting, for the application of ornament to standardized vessels (transfer ware).

Many different Chinese-inspired landscape patterns were at first produced in this way, both on bone china or porcellanous wares, and on white earthenware or pearlware. The Willow pattern became the most popular and persistent of them, and in various permutations has remained in production to the present day. Characteristically the background colour is white and the image blue, but various factories have used other colours in monochrome tints and there are Victorian versions with hand-touched polychrome colouring on simple outline transfers.

In the United States of America, the pattern is commonly referred to as Blue Willow.

== Creation and description ==
The exact date of the pattern's invention is not certain. During the 1780s various engravers including Thomas Turner and Thomas Minton were producing chinoiserie landscape scenes based on Chinese ceramic originals for the Caughley 'Salopian China Manufactory' (near Broseley, Shropshire), then under the direction of Thomas Turner. These included scenes with willows, boats, pavilions and birds which were later incorporated into the Willow pattern. However, the Caughley factory did not produce the English Willow pattern in its completed form.

Thomas Lucas and his printer James Richards left Caughley in c. 1783 to work for Josiah Spode, who produced many early Chinese-inspired transferwares during the 1780s and 1790s. Thomas Minton left Caughley in 1785 and set up on his own account in c. 1793 in Stoke-on-Trent producing earthenwares: he is thought to have engraved versions of willow designs for Spode and for various other factories. It was probably for Spode that the English Willow pattern was created and first produced perhaps around 1790, because it incorporates particular, distinctive features of earlier Chinese willow scenes which were already known and imitated at the Spode factory.

The Willow pattern is commonly presented in a circular or ovate frame. The waterside landscape represents a garden in the lower right side, in which a large two-storey pavilion stands. Approached by steps, the lower storey has three large pillars with arched windows or openings between. The roof and gable, shown in three-quarter perspective, is surmounted by a smaller room similarly roofed, and there are curling finials at the gables and eaves. It is surrounded by bushes and trees with varied fruit and foliage, including a large tree rising behind with clusters of oranges. Another pavilion roof appears among the trees to the right and a smaller pavilion stands to the left projecting from the waterside bank. A path through the garden leads to the front of the scene and is crossed by a fence of diapered panels set zig-zag fashion across the foreground.

On its left side the garden forms an irregular and indented bank into the water, from the foreground of which a large branching willow tree with four clusters of three leafy fronds leans out. From this point a bridge, usually of three arches, crosses left to an island or bank with a house having a tall arched doorway, and a small tree behind. There are usually three figures on the bridge going away from the garden. Above and beyond this the water (shown white) forms an open expanse, with a boat at the centre left containing two little house-like cabins, propelled by a figure with a punt-pole aforeships. In the upper left quarter is a distant island or promontory with pavilions and trees, including a fir. Above the scene in the centre is a pair of flying swallows, one turning and one descending, their heads and beaks turned closely towards one another in amorous conjunction.

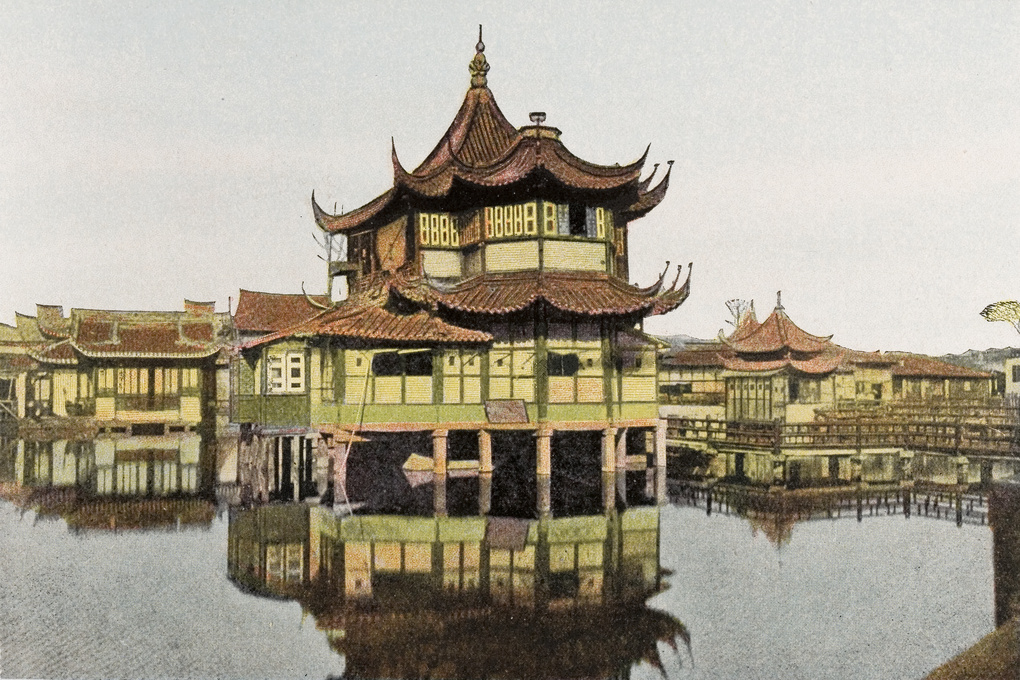
A pavilion in Shanghai noted for its resemblance to the pattern.

It is the inclusion of the bridge, the garden fence, the central pair of birds, and the particular details of the pavilions and surrounding trees, in this arrangement, which together characterize the English Willow pattern in its standard form.

== Legends ==
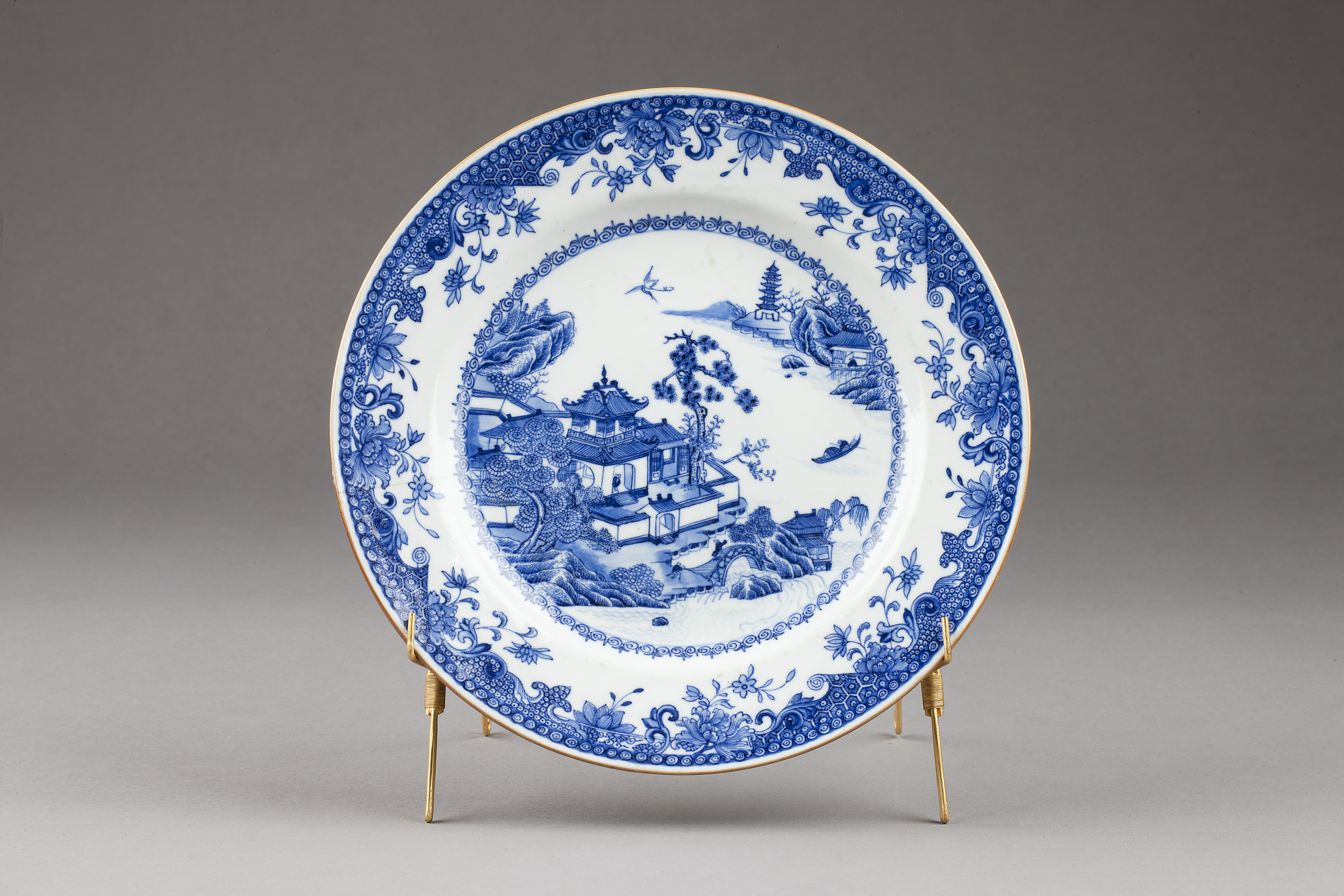
Comparable design in Chinese export porcelain, c. 1760

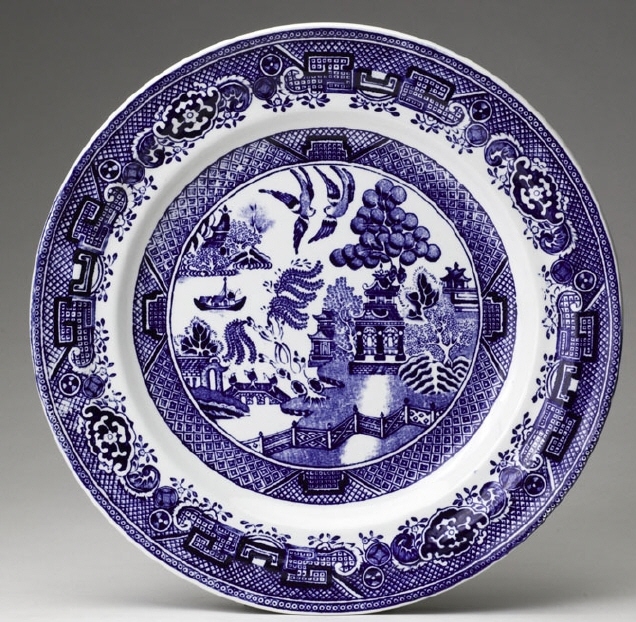
Another version, Sweden

In order to promote sales of Minton's Willow pattern, various stories were invented based on the elements of the design. The most famous story usually runs as described below. The story is based on the Japanese fairy tale "The Green Willow" and other ancient fairy tales originating in China about the constellations that tell the story of two lovers separated and envied by gods for their love. The lovers can only meet once a year when the stars align. There are English stories about the plates, the most common of which "appeared in its final form in 1849", though other versions of the story would be produced afterwards.

=== The romantic fable ===
Once there was a wealthy Mandarin, who had a beautiful daughter (Koong-se). She had fallen in love with her father's humble accounting assistant (Chang), angering her father, as it was inappropriate for them to marry due to their difference in social class. He dismissed the young man and built a high fence around his house to keep the lovers apart. The Mandarin was planning for his daughter to marry a powerful Duke. The Duke arrived by boat to claim his bride, bearing a box of jewels as a gift. The wedding was to take place on the day the blossom fell from the willow tree.

On the eve of the daughter's wedding to the Duke, the young accountant, disguised as a servant, slipped into the palace unnoticed. As the lovers escaped with the jewels, the alarm was raised. They ran over a bridge, chased by the Mandarin, whip in hand. They eventually escaped on the Duke's ship to the safety of a secluded island, where they lived happily for years. However, the Duke learned of their refuge. Hungry for revenge, he sent soldiers, who captured the lovers and put them to death. The gods, moved by their plight, transformed the lovers into a pair of doves.

=== Cultural impact of the story ===
The story of the willow pattern was turned into a comic opera in 1901 called The Willow Pattern. It was also told in a 1914 silent film called Story of the Willow Pattern. Robert van Gulik also used some of the idea in his Chinese detective novel The Willow Pattern. In 1992, Barry Purves made a short animated film relating the story, transplanted to Japan and entitled Screen Play.

=== The old poem ===
Two birds flying high,
A Chinese vessel, sailing by.
A bridge with three men, sometimes four,
A willow tree, hanging o'er.
A Chinese temple, there it stands,
Built upon the river sands.
An apple tree, with apples on,
A crooked fence to end my song.

Another old poem from late nineteenth century Shropshire is:

Two swallows flying high,
A little boat passing by,
A little bridge, with willows over,
Three men going to Dover,
Now Dover church stands very bare,
Twice a week they worship there,
A little tree with apples on,
And plaited palings in the sun

Scottish version:

Twa little birdies flying high,
A little boatie sailing by;
Three mannies ga'en to Dover,
A willow tree hangin' over;
A kirkie stannin' fair,
Mony gang tae worship there;
An aipple tree win aipples on't,
An' a iron railin a' along't.

== In popular culture ==
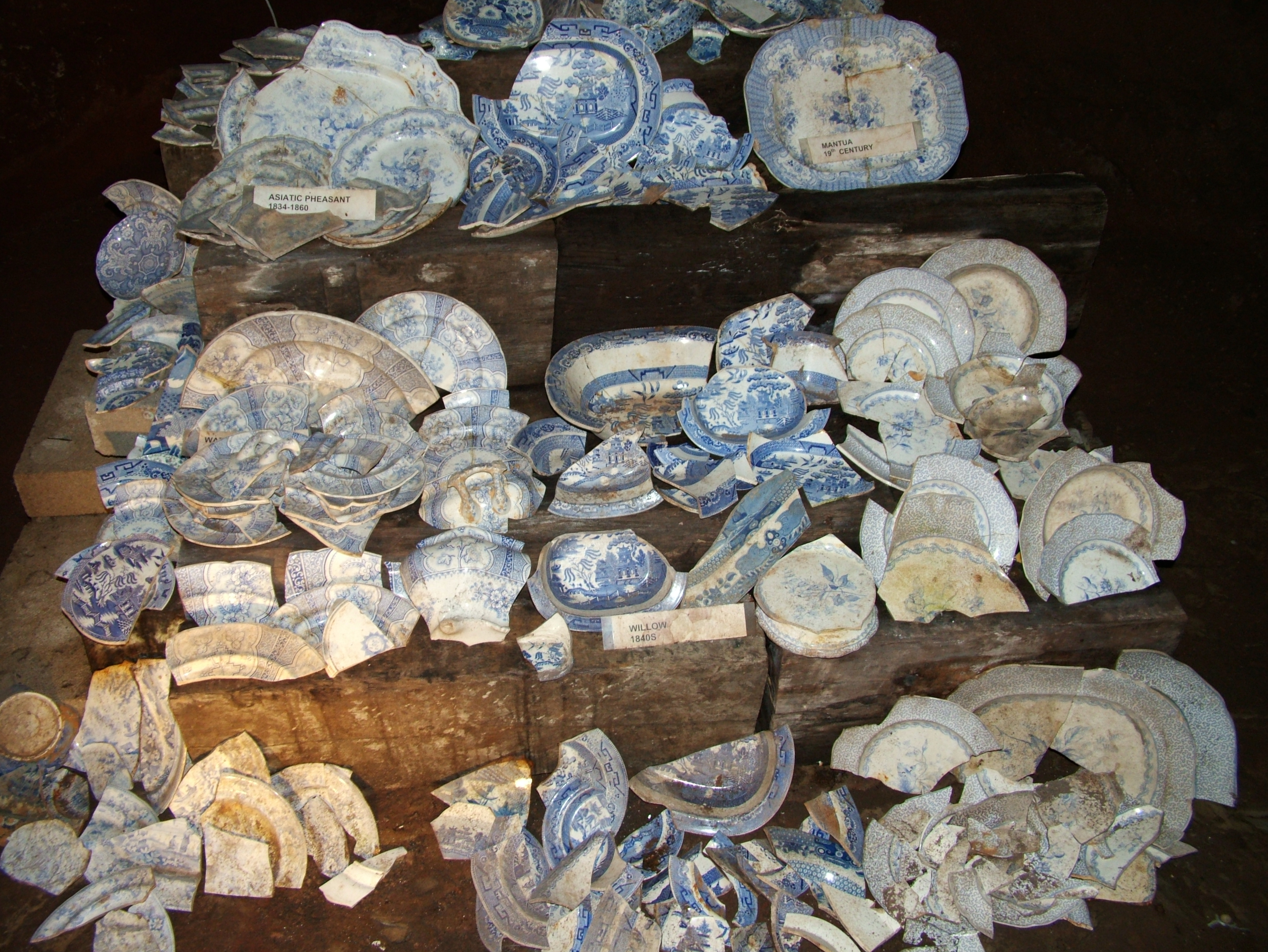
Many plates featuring the Willow pattern were found in Williamson's tunnels

Willow-ware platters feature as plot points in Lucy Maud Montgomery's 1909 novel Anne of Avonlea, as one platter belonging to the aunt of Diana Barry is smashed, and the titular Anne Shirley gets into an adventure trying to replace it.

"The Story of Wong Ts'in and the Willow Plate Embellishment" is narrated by the storyteller Kai Lung in Ernest Bramah's 1922 novel Kai Lung's Golden Hours. This short story, created by Bramah, is quite different from the standard romantic fable outlined above.

Blue Willow, specifically gold-rimmed pieces coming from Gilman Collamore, New York, was the china of choice at William Randolph Hearst's "La Cuesta Encantada" estate in San Simeon, California, being Hearst's mother's favorite pattern.

In addition to being used on camera to evoke a 19th-century atmosphere in several American western movies (as well as western television shows, and even the comedy, The Munsters), Blue Willow china is also featured in The Andy Griffith Show and Murder, She Wrote, suggesting a contemporary time or setting when life was simpler. It was also seen in the movies Funny Farm, Sleepy Hollow and Frenzy.

This story is represented in the children's book The Willow Pattern Story, by Allan Drummond.

Blue Willow by Doris Gates (1940) is a children's novel, a realist fictional account of the Dust Bowl and the Great Depression years that has been called "The Grapes of Wrath for children". The eponymous Blue Willow plate, a gift from her great-grandmother, is the prized possession of Janey Larkin, the young daughter of a migrant worker family. The Blue Willow pattern comes to represent Janey's dream of a permanent home.

Taylor Brothers, of Sheffield, England, manufacturers of saws and blades in the 19th and 20th centuries, made a line of Willow Saws, with a medallion using part of the Willow pattern. The blue Willow Pattern over the years has been used to advertise all kinds of goods and services. This forms the subject of a two-volume publication.

Blue Willow china and its legends appear in Lee Blessing's play Going to St. Ives.

In Terry Pratchett's novel Interesting Times, an oriental artist is about to paint (on a plate) a picture of a garden scene when some sumo wrestlers and guards come crashing through and destroy his entire palette except for blue. He resolves to paint, in just that one colour, a picture that the world will remember for centuries.

In Beatrix Potter's The Tale of Mr. Tod the badger Tommy Brock lays out a blue willow pattern pie-dish in preparation to cook and eat Flopsy and Benjamin Bunny's children.

In Jordan Peele's 2017 film Get Out, Missy Armitage uses a blue Willow teacup to hypnotize Chris Washington.
