= Herbert Minton =

English potter

- Born: 4 February 1793; Stoke-on-Trent, England
- Died: 1 April 1858 (aged 65); Torquay, England
- Occupation: Potter

Herbert Minton (4 February 1793 – 1 April 1858) was an English manufacturer of pottery and porcelain. He took over his father's company, Thomas Minton & Sons.

== Biography ==
Minton was the second son of Thomas Minton, potter. He was born at Stoke-on-Trent on 4 February 1793. His father was a native of Shropshire, and was brought up as an engraver at the Caughley pottery works, near Broseley, under John Turner, who is stated to have discovered the art of printing in blue on china. He afterwards went to London and worked for Josiah Spode at his London house of business in Lincoln's Inn Fields. In 1788 he settled at Stoke and founded the concern which has since become celebrated.

Minton was educated at Audlem school, Cheshire, and in 1817 he and his elder brother were taken into partnership. The father died in 1836, and the brother entered the church. Herbert was thus left alone in the business. "Neither a man of profound research nor an educated artist," wrote Mr. Digby Wyatt, in a paper read before the Society of Arts, "neither an economist nor an inventor, by courage and ceaseless energy he brought to bear upon the creation of his ultimately colossal business such a combination of science, art, organisation, and invention as can be paralleled only" in the case of "his great predecessor Josiah Wedgwood." Like Wedgwood, Minton surrounded himself with talented artists and ingenious inventors. Down to about 1830 nothing but earthenware and ordinary soft porcelain were made by the firm, but by the efforts of Minton and his partners the manufacture of hard porcelain, parian, encaustic tiles, azulejosor coloured enamel tiles, mosaics, Della Robbia ware, majolica, and Palissy ware was gradually introduced. The firm was fortunate in obtaining the patronage of the Duke of Sutherland, who lived at Trentham. Minton contributed a remarkable collection to the exhibition held in Birmingham in 1849 in connection with the meeting of the British Association. He was awarded a council medal at the Great Exhibition of 1851, and his specimens of majolica ware at the Paris exhibition of 1855 created great interest. About 1,800 some fifty hands were employed at the works, but when Minton died the number reached fifteen hundred. The business was divided between his two nephews in 1868, Mr. Colin Minton Campbell retaining the china and earthenware business, while Mr. M. D. Hollins took the encaustic tile manufactory. He lived for many years at Hartshill, near Stoke, where in 1842 he built and endowed a church and schools. The church is one of Sir George Gilbert Scott's early works. He died at Torquay, 1 April 1858, and was buried at Hartshill. The School of Art at Stoke was erected by Public subscription as a memorial to Minton. It was opened in 1860.
