= Old Country Roses =

Old Country Roses is a pattern of bone china made by English tableware manufacturer, Royal Albert, a brand of Royal Doulton. It is said to be the best selling pattern for tea services in the world since its creation in 1962.
