= Robert Minton =

Robert Minton may refer to:

- Robert Minton (bobsleigh) (1904–1974), American bobsledder
- Robert Minton (cricketer) (1899–1928), English cricketer
- Bob Minton (1946–2010), millionaire who helped finance lawsuits against the Church of Scientology
