= Manton (name) =

Manton is both a surname and an uncommon given name of English and Irish origins. It is derived from various place names throughout England, while in Ireland it is the anglicized form of the Gaelic "Ó Manntáin", or "descendant of Manntán", a personal name derived from a diminutive of "manntach" ("toothless"). Notable persons with the name include:

== Surname ==
- Rev. David Manton (born 1936), Australian Uniting Church minister
- Frederick Manton (1830–1891), Australian politician
- Irene Manton (1904–1988), British botanist
- James Thomas Manton (1812–1899), surveyor in Australia's Northern Territory
- Jonathan Manton, Australian engineer
- Joseph Manton (1766–1835), English gun maker
- Martin T. Manton (1880–1946), U.S. Circuit Court Judge
- Nicholas Manton (born 1952), British mathematical physicist
- Sidnie Milana Manton (1902–1979), British entomologist
- Thomas J. Manton (1932–2006), American congressman (was of Irish ancestry)
- Thomas Manton (1620–1677), English Puritan theologian

== Given name ==
- Manton Eddy (1892–1962), Lieutenant General of the United States Army
