= Manton =

Manton may refer to:

== Places ==
Australia

- Manton, New South Wales
- Manton, Northern Territory
- Manton, Queensland, a neighbourhood in the City of Townsville

Myanmar

- Manton Township in North Shan State
- Mantong, Myanmar, the principal town of Manton Township

United Kingdom

- Manton, Lincolnshire
- Manton, Nottinghamshire
- Manton, Rutland
- Manton, Wiltshire

United States

- Manton, California
- Manton, Kentucky
- Manton, Michigan
- Manton, Providence, Rhode Island

== Other ==
- Manton (name)
- Baron Manton, a title in the peerage of the United Kingdom
  - Joseph Watson, 1st Baron Manton (1873–1922), industrialist and philanthropist
  - George Miles Watson, 2nd Baron Manton (1899–1968), racehorse breeder
  - Rupert Watson, 3rd Baron Manton (1924–2003)
- The Mad Miss Manton is an American film that premiered in the year 1938

== See also ==
- Normanton (disambiguation)
- Menton
