= Spode Museum =

Pottery-industry museum in Stoke-on-Trent, England

Coordinates: 53.005°N 2.186°W

The Spode Museum is based in Stoke-on-Trent, England, where Josiah Spode, known for his role in the Industrial Revolution, established his pottery business in 1774. The Spode Museum collection includes a ceramics collection representing 200 years of Spode manufacture, ranging from spectacular pieces made for Royalty, the Great Exhibitions and the very rich to simple domestic wares.

== History ==
Spode's achievements include the formulation of Bone China, which became the standard for all English chinawares, and the development and perfection of underglaze transfer printing on earthenwares, which enabled mass-production of attractively decorated ceramic items on a scale never previously achieved. By the early 1820s, his factory, now managed by his son Josiah Spode II and his business partner William Copeland, had become the largest in Stoke, employing some 2,000 workers and boasting 22 bottle ovens.

Spode's factory was in continuous production from 1774 to 2008, when it finally closed (although the brand was subsequently purchased by Portmeirion, who continue to make Spode branded wares at their own factory in Stoke). The Spode factory occupied some 90 buildings on a 9 acres (3.6 ha) site and such was the amount of space available that over the years many thousands of items that might otherwise have been thrown out were simply put into store. Consequently, over the two centuries when the factory was operational, a massive quantity of papers and objects was accumulated.

In 1987 the Spode company, recognising the importance and uniqueness of its archive and collection, established the Spode Museum Trust, an independent charitable body, to take over the entire collection. This step was taken to protect the collection in perpetuity irrespective of whatever economic misfortunes the Spode company might suffer in the future.

In April 2018, the museum was hit by a car damaging items in the museum shop. In 2022, the museum hosted an exhibition of art made from the damaged items.

== Collection ==
This collection is recognised as the largest and most wide-ranging single collection of Spode wares in the world. It also includes a "paper" archive of some ¼ million documents and early photographs, of which the most important are the 70,000 hand-painted watercolour images of every pattern produced since around 1800. In addition, some 25,000 engraved copper plates, used as the basis for printed wares, dating back from the 1790s and recognised to be the largest collection of its type in the world. There is also a collection of antique potters' tools and machinery, some dating back before 1800.

Since 2008, most of the collection has been in storage, but with the support of the Heritage Lottery Fund, in 2012 the Spode Museum Trust opened the Spode Works Visitor Centre in part of the historic Spode factory.
