= Jonathan Manton =

Australian electrical engineer

Jonathan Manton in an Australian electrical engineer and academic. He is a distinguished chair at the University of Melbourne and Future Generation Professor in Electrical and Electronic Engineering. He was named Fellow of the Institute of Electrical and Electronics Engineers (IEEE) in 2016 for contributions to geometric methods in signal processing and wireless communications.

== Education ==
Manton holds a Bachelor of Science (mathematics) and Bachelor of Engineering (electrical) degrees in 1995 and his Ph.D. degree in 1998, from the University of Melbourne.
