= Mountain (surname) =

Mountain is the surname of the following people

- Edgar Mountain (1901–1985), British runner
- Frank Mountain (1860–1939), American baseball player
- Lance Mountain (born 1964), American skateboarder
- Pat Mountain (footballer) (born 1976), former Welsh footballer
- Patricia Mountain, English politician
- Peter Mountain (1923–2013), English violinist
- Reginald Mountain (1899–1981), British civil engineer
- Ronald Gervase Mountain (1897–1983), British Indian Army officer
