= Spode =

English brand of pottery and homewares

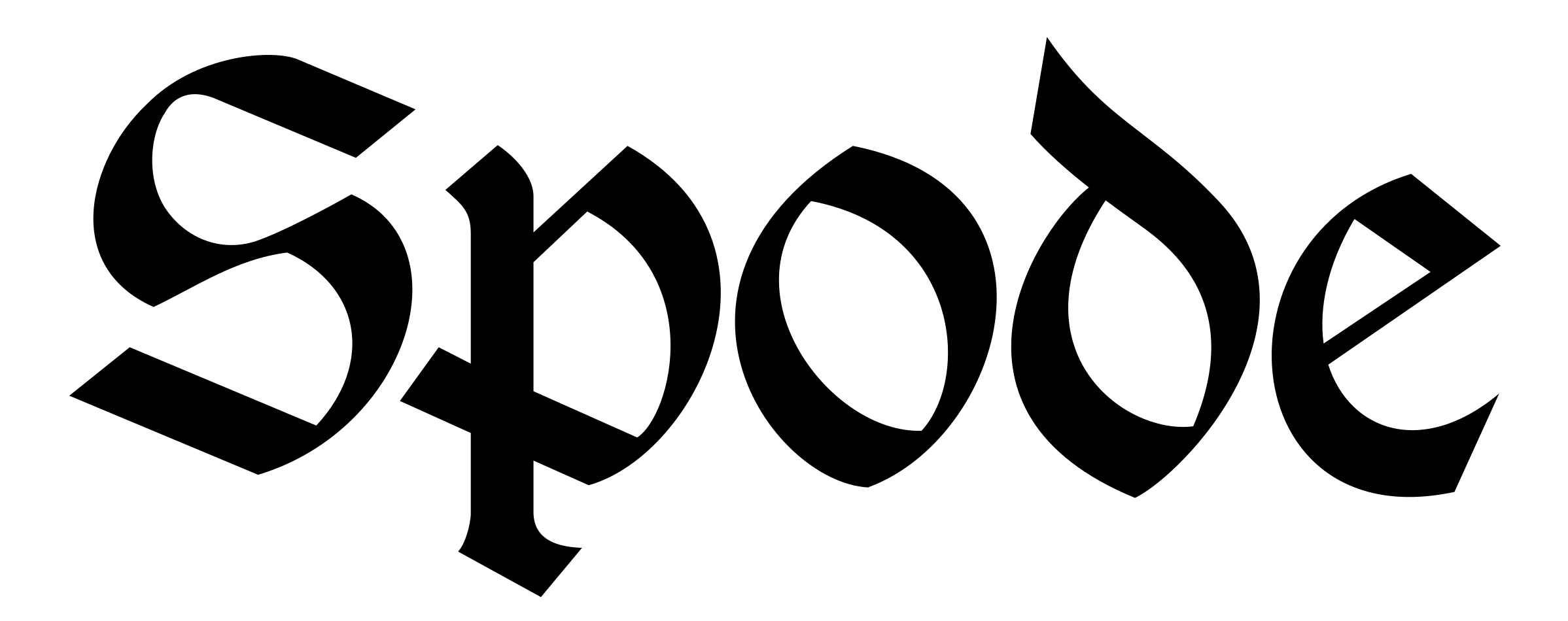
- Company type: Subsidiary
- Industry: Pottery
- Founded: 1770
- Founder: Josiah Spode
- Headquarters: Stoke-on-Trent, England
- Products: Pottery; housewares
- Parent: Portmeirion Group
- Website: spode.co.uk; spode.com

Spode is an English brand of pottery and homewares produced in Stoke-on-Trent, England. Spode was founded by Josiah Spode (1733–1797) in 1770, and was responsible for perfecting two important techniques that were crucial to the worldwide success of the English pottery industry in the 19th century: transfer printing on earthenware and bone china.

Spode perfected the technique for transfer printing in underglaze blue on fine earthenware in 1783–1784 – a development that led to the launch in 1816 of Spode's Blue Italian range, which has remained in production ever since. The company is credited with developing, around 1790, the formula for bone china. Josiah Spode's son, Josiah Spode II, successfully marketed bone china.

In 2008, the Copeland Spode company went through some financial troubles. It was taken over in 2009 by Portmeirion Group, a pottery and homewares company based in Stoke-on-Trent. Many items in Spode's Blue Italian and Woodland ranges are made at Portmeirion Group's factory in Stoke-on-Trent.

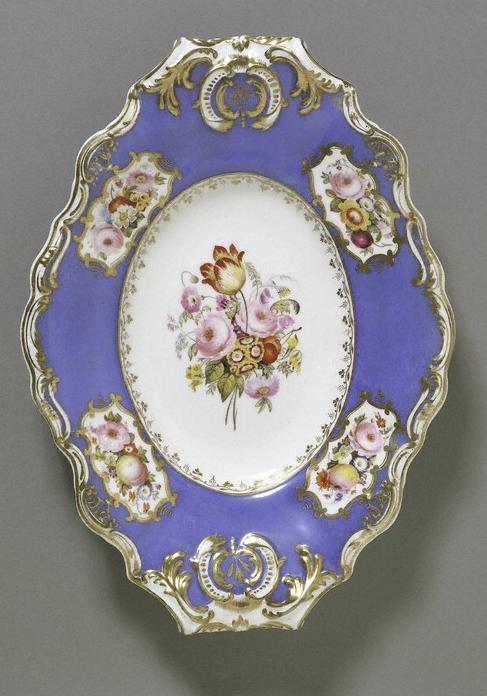
Dish, 1831, manufactured by Spode Ceramic Works V&A Museum no. 566A-1902

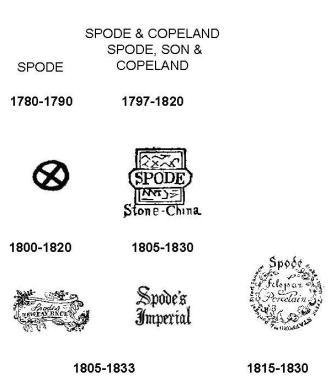

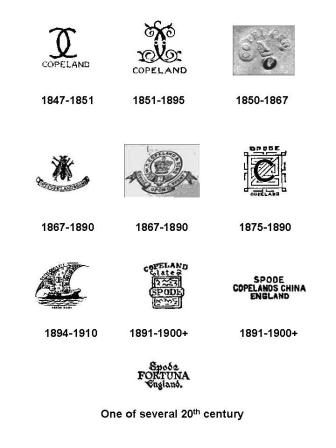

== Foundation ==
Josiah Spode is known to have worked for potter Thomas Whieldon from the age of 16 until he was 21. He then worked in a number of partnerships until he went into business for himself, renting a small potworks in Stoke-on-Trent in 1767; in 1776 he completed the purchase of what became the Spode factory until 2008. His early products comprised earthenwares such as creamware (a fine cream-coloured earthenware) and pearlware (a fine earthenware with a bluish glaze) as well as a range of stonewares including black basalt, caneware, and jasper which had been popularised by Josiah Wedgwood. The history and products of the Spode factory have inspired generations of historians and collectors, and a useful interactive online exhibition was launched in October 2010.

=== Underglaze blue transfer printing ===
Josiah Spode I is credited with the introduction of underglaze blue transfer printing on earthenware in 1783–84. The Worcester and Caughley factories had commenced transfer printing underglaze and over glaze on porcelain in the early 1750s, and from 1756 overglaze printing was also applied to earthenware and stoneware. The processes for underglaze and overglaze decoration were very different. Overglaze "bat printing" on earthenware was a fairly straightforward process, and designs in a range of colours including black, red and lilac were produced. Underglaze "hot-press" printing was limited to the colours that would withstand the subsequent glaze firing, and a rich blue was the predominant colour.

To adapt the process from the production of small porcelain teaware to larger earthenware dinnerware required the creation of more flexible paper to transmit the designs from the engraved copper plate to the biscuit earthenware body, and the development of a glaze recipe that brought the colour of the black-blue cobalt print to a brilliant perfection. When Spode employed the skilled engraver Thomas Lucas and printer James Richard, both of the Caughley factory, in 1783 he was able to introduce high quality blue printed earthenware to the market. Thomas Minton, another Caughley-trained engraver, also supplied copper plates to Spode until he opened his own factory in Stoke-on-Trent in 1796.

This method involved the engraving of a design on a copper plate, which was then printed onto gummed tissue. The colour paste was worked into the cut areas of the copper plate and wiped from the uncut surfaces, and then printed by passing through rollers. These designs, including edge-patterns which had to be manipulated in sections, were cut out using scissors and applied to the biscuit-fired ware (using a white fabric), itself prepared with a gum solution. The tissue was then floated off in water, leaving the pattern adhering to the plate. This was then dipped in the glaze and returned to the kiln for the glost firing. Blue underglaze transfer became a standard feature of Staffordshire pottery. Spode also used on-glaze transfers for other wares. The well-known Spode blue-and-white dinner services with engraved sporting scenes and Italian views were developed under Josiah Spode the younger, but continued to be reproduced into much later times.

=== Bone china ===
During the 18th century, many English potters were striving and competing to discover the secret of the production of porcelain. The Plymouth and Bristol factories, and (from 1782 to 1810) the New Hall (Staffordshire) factory under Richard Champion's patent, were producing hard paste similar to Oriental porcelain. The technique was developed by adding calcined bone to this glassy frit, for example in the productions of Bow porcelain and Chelsea porcelain, and this was carried on from at least the 1750s onwards. Soapstone porcelains further added steatite, known as French chalk, for instance at Worcester and Caughley factories.

The bone porcelains, especially those of Spode, Minton, Davenport and Coalport. Although the Bow porcelain factory, Chelsea porcelain factory, Royal Worcester and Royal Crown Derby factories had, before Spode, established a proportion of about 40–45 per cent calcined bone in the formula as standard, it was Spode who first abandoned the practice of calcining the bone with some of the other ingredients, and used a mix of bone ash, china stone and kaolin, which remains the basic recipe of bone china. The traditional bone china recipe was six parts bone-ash, four parts china stone and 3.5 parts kaolin.

Josiah Spode I effectively finalised the formula, and appears to have been doing so between 1789 and 1793. It remained an industrial secret for some time. The importance of his innovations has been disputed, being played down by Arthur Church in his English Porcelain, estimated practically by William Burton, and being very highly esteemed by Spode's contemporary Alexandre Brongniart, director of the Sèvres manufactory, in his Traité des Arts Céramiques, and by M. L. Solon hailed as a revolutionary improvement.

Many examples of the elder Spode's productions were destroyed in a fire at Alexandra Palace, London in 1873, where they were included in an exhibition of nearly five thousand specimens of English pottery and porcelain.

The business was carried on through his sons at Stoke until April 1833. Spode's London retail shop in Portugal Street went by the name of Spode, Son, and Copeland.

Among the many surviving Spode documents are two shape books dated to about 1820 which contain thumbnail sketches of bone china objects with instructions to throwers and turners about size requirements. One copy is in the Joseph Downes collection at Winterthur Museum, Garden and Library in Delaware, United States.

== Spode "Stone-China" ==
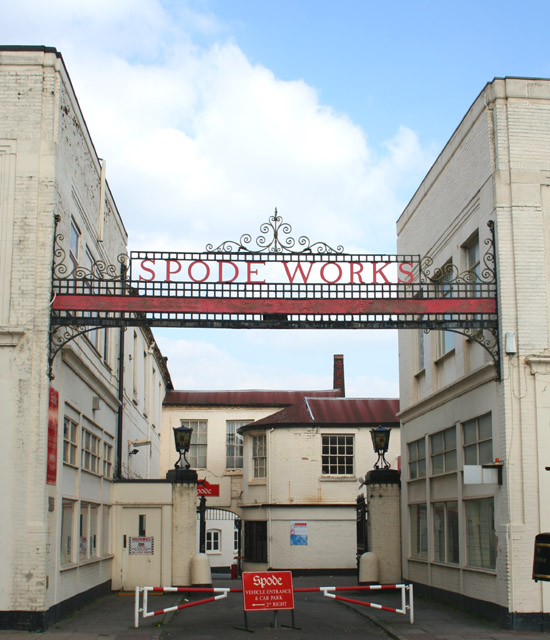
Entrance to Spode Pottery Works, Stoke

After some early trials Spode perfected a stoneware that came closer to porcelain than any previously, and introduced his "Stone-China" in 1813. It was light in body, greyish-white and gritty where it was not glazed and approached translucence in the early wares. Spode pattern books, which record about 75,000 patterns, survive from about 1800.

In Spode's similar "Felspar porcelain", introduced on the market in 1821, felspar was an ingredient, substituted for the Cornish stone in his standard bone china body, giving rise to his slightly misleading name "Felspar porcelain", to what is in fact an extremely refined stoneware comparable to the rival "Mason's ironstone", produced by Josiah II's nephew, Charles James Mason, and patented in 1813. Spode's "Felspar porcelain" continued into the Copeland & Garrett phase of the company (1833–1847). Armorial services were provided for the Honourable East India Company, 1823, and the Worshipful Company of Goldsmiths, c1824. Some of the ware employed underglaze blue and iron red with touches of gilding in imitation of "Imari porcelain" that had been introduced on Spode's bone china in the first decade of the century: the most familiar "Tobacco-leaf pattern" (2061) continued to be made by Spode's successors, William Taylor Copeland, and then "W.T. Copeland & Sons, late Spode".

== Later forms of the business ==
Messrs Spode were succeeded in the same business in c. 1833 by Copeland and Garrett, who often used the name Spode in their marks. In particular these are called 'Late Spode' and include productions of the so-called 'Felspar porcelain'. They also produced other kinds of bone china, earthenware, parian, etc. The partnership continued in this form until 1847. After 1847 the business continued until 1970 as W.T. Copeland and sons, and again the term 'Spode' or 'Late Spode' continued in use alongside the name of Copeland. Under the name 'Spode Ltd' the same factories and business were continued after 1970.

In 2006, the business merged with Royal Worcester. The merged company entered administration on 6 November 2008. The brand names Royal Worcester and Spode, the intellectual property and some of the stock were acquired by Portmeirion Group on 23 April 2009.

The purchase did not include Royal Worcester or Spode manufacturing facilities. Many items in Spode's Blue Italian and Woodland ranges are now made at Portmeirion Group's factory in Stoke-on-Trent.

In 2012, the Spode Museum Trust opened the Spode Works Visitor Centre in part of the historic Spode factory.

== See also ==
- Spode Museum
