= Transfer printing =

Method of decorating ceramics

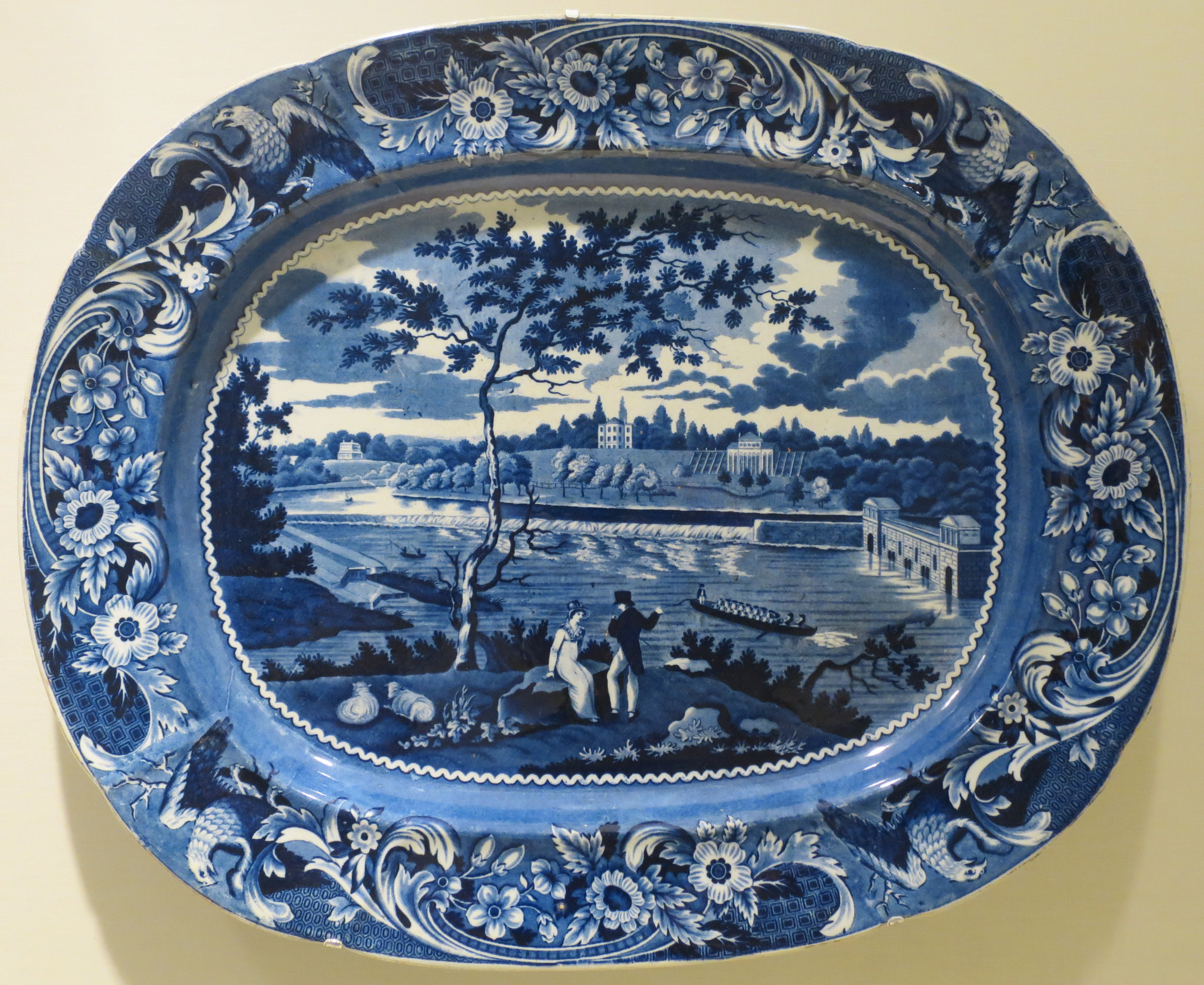
A typical platter from the heyday of transferware, 1820–1850; an American scene ("Fair Mount near Philadelphia") in English earthenware Staffordshire pottery

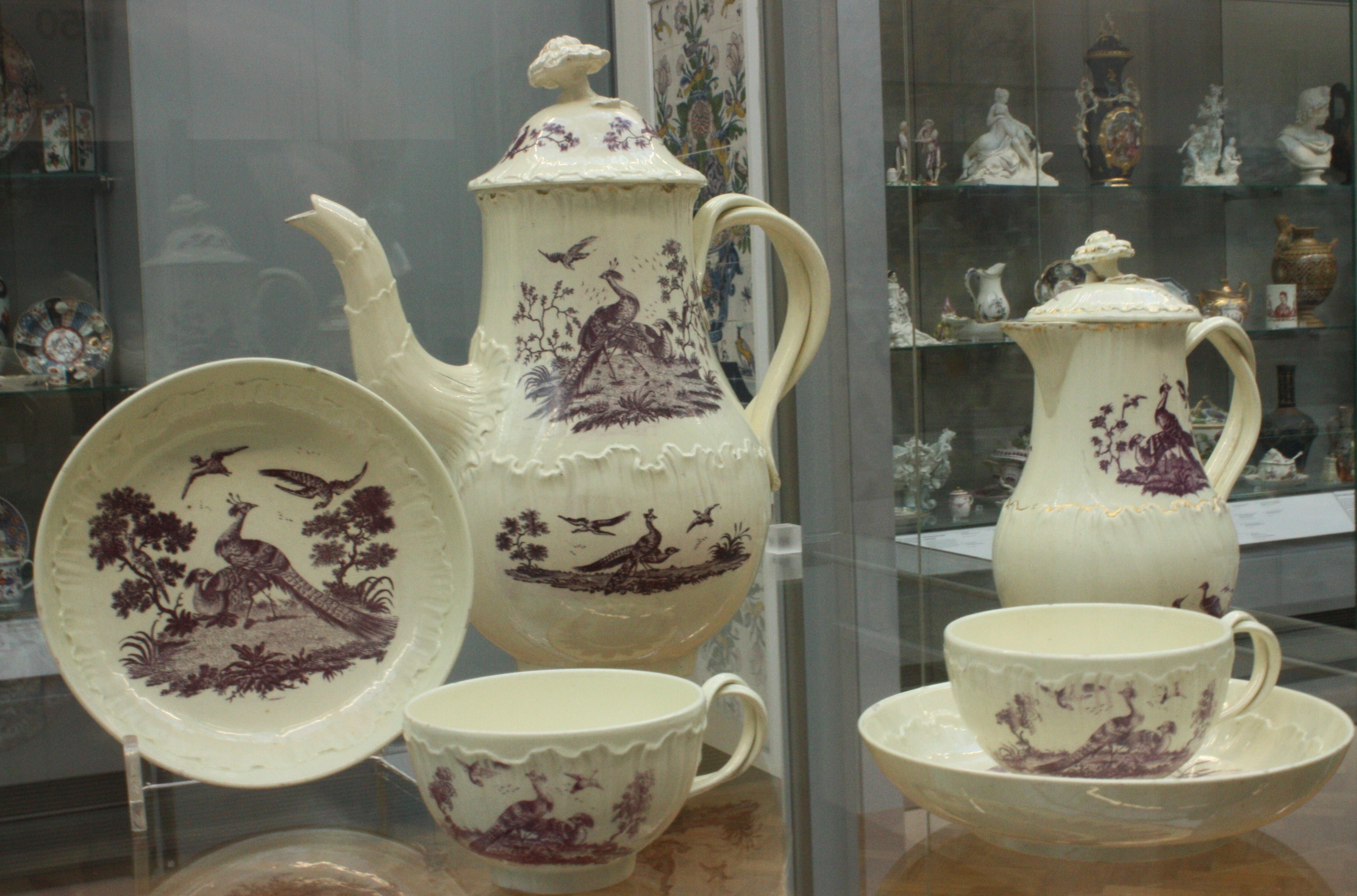
A transfer-printed Wedgwood tea and coffee service. c. 1775, Staffordshire, Victoria & Albert Museum

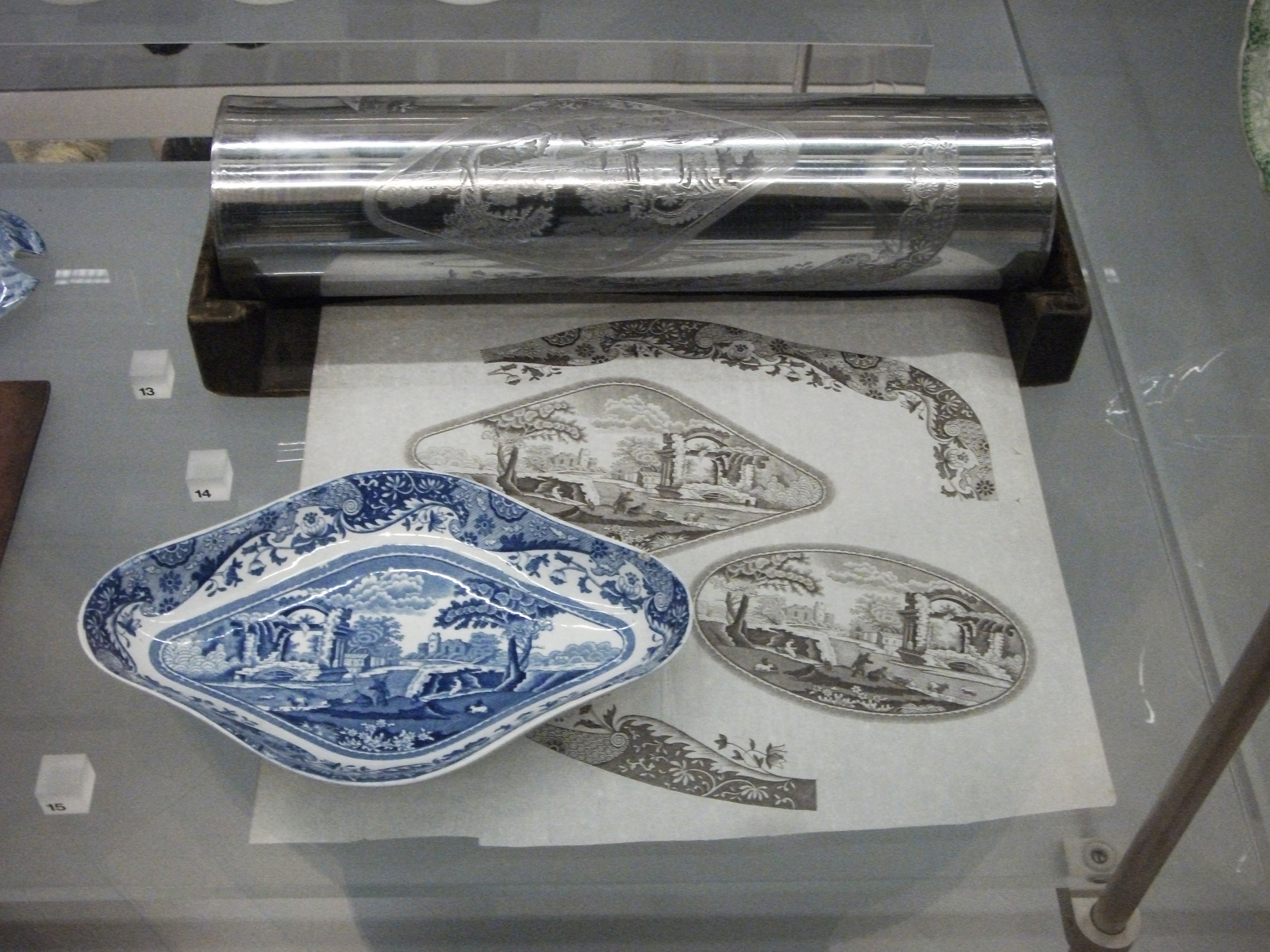
A steel roller for transfer printing with the resulting end product

Transfer printing is a method of decorating pottery or other materials using an engraved copper or steel plate from which a monochrome print on paper is taken which is then transferred by pressing onto the ceramic piece. Pottery decorated using this technique is known as transferware or transfer ware.

It was developed in England from the 1750s on, and in the 19th century became enormously popular in England, though relatively little used in other major pottery-producing countries. The bulk of production was from the dominant Staffordshire pottery industry. America was a major market for English transfer-printed wares, whose imagery was adapted to the American market; several makers made this almost exclusively.

The technique was essential for adding complex decoration such as the Willow pattern to relatively cheap pottery. In particular, transfer printing brought the price of a matching dinner service low enough for large numbers of people to afford.

Apart from pottery, the technique was used on metal, and enamelled metal, and sometimes on wood and textiles. It remains used today, although mostly superseded by lithography. In the 19th century methods of transfer printing in colour were developed.

== Process ==
The process starts with an engraved metal printing plate similar to those used for making engravings or etchings on paper. The plate is used to print the pattern on tissue paper, using mixes of special pigments that stand up to firing as the "ink". The transfer is then put pigment-side down onto the piece of pottery, so that the sticky ink transfers to the ceramic surface. Usually, several different transfer sections were needed for each piece if the design covered the whole object (see illustration). The paper is either floated off by soaking the piece in water, or left to burn off during the firing. This can be done over or under the ceramic glaze, but the underglaze ("underprinting") method gives much more durable decoration. The ceramic is then glazed (if this had not been done already) and fired in a kiln to fix the pattern. With overglaze printing only a low-temperature firing was needed. The process produces fine lines similar to engraved prints.

Before transfer printing, ceramics were hand painted, a laborious and costly process. Transfer printing enabled the high quality of representation that had been developed in painting on porcelain to be done far more cheaply, in the process making large numbers of painters redundant. Initially, it was also mostly used on porcelain, but after a few years it was also used on the new high-quality earthenwares that English potters had been developing, such as creamware and pearlware.

By the end of the 18th century, a variant technique giving "bat-printed" wares was introduced. This used "pliable glue bats or slabs" of a rubbery texture instead of the paper. The plate printed glue onto the bat, which was then transferred to the piece, and powdered pigments were then added, which stuck to the glue. The technique was associated with the introduction of stippling rather than line engraving as the technique used on the copper plates. The process was much more complicated, and little used after about 1820.

=== Colour ===
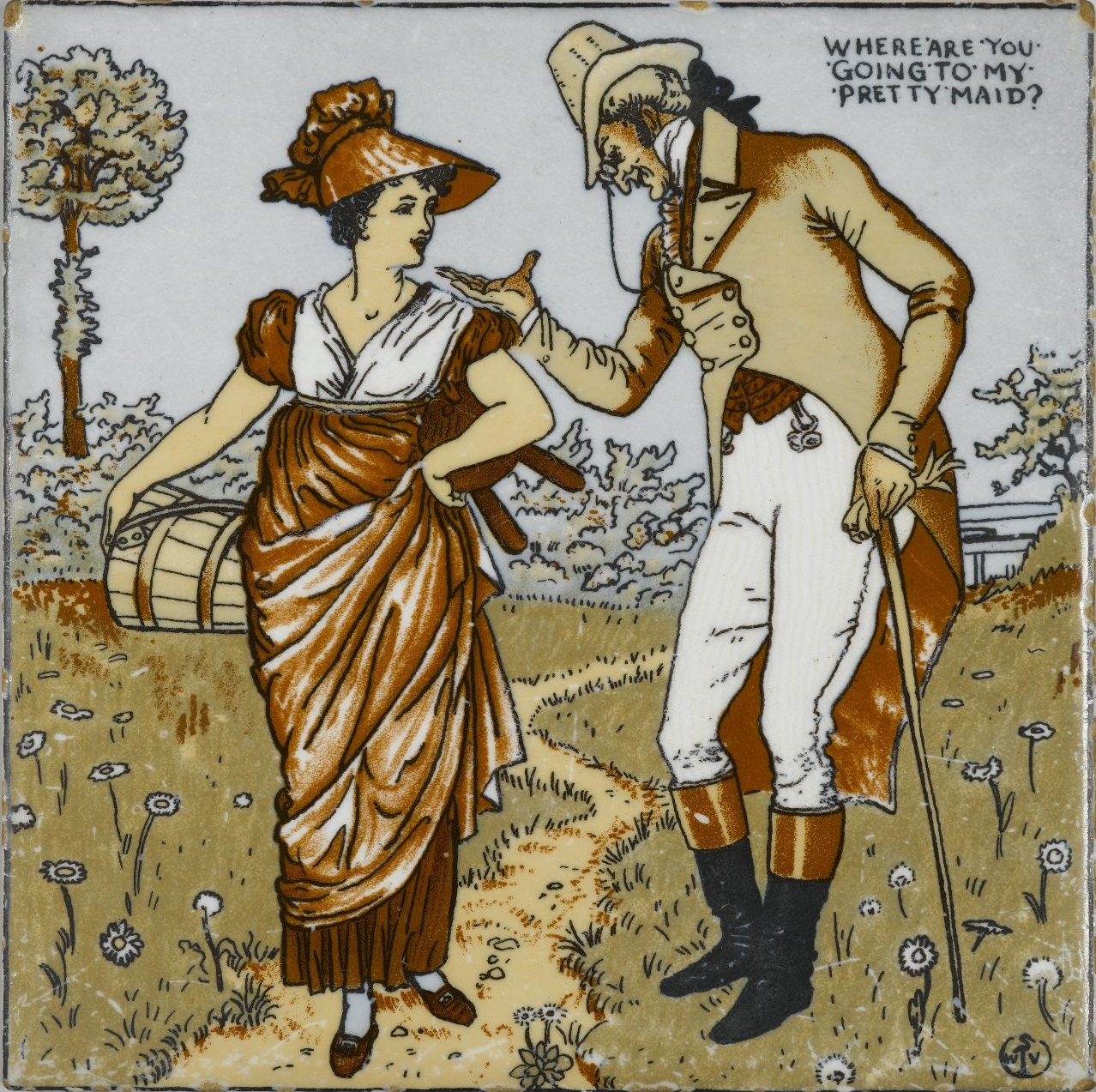
Tile designed by Walter Crane, c. 1890, made in Wheeling, West Virginia

Both these techniques printed a single colour, which was most often the cobalt blue that had been heavily used for painting pottery for centuries. Its success was because the colour was attractive, and cobalt kept its colour in firing even at very high porcelain temperatures. Initially cobalt blue, black and brown were probably the only colour options for underglaze transfer printing.

Transfer printing could be supplemented with colour added by hand, or gilding, and this technique was used from early on. The use of multiple transfers, each with a different colour, was introduced quite early when different areas were printed in each colour, for example, a plate with the centre in one colour, and the border in another. It was more difficult to build up a full polychrome image, but this was perfected by Messrs F&R Pratt of Fenton in the 1840s.

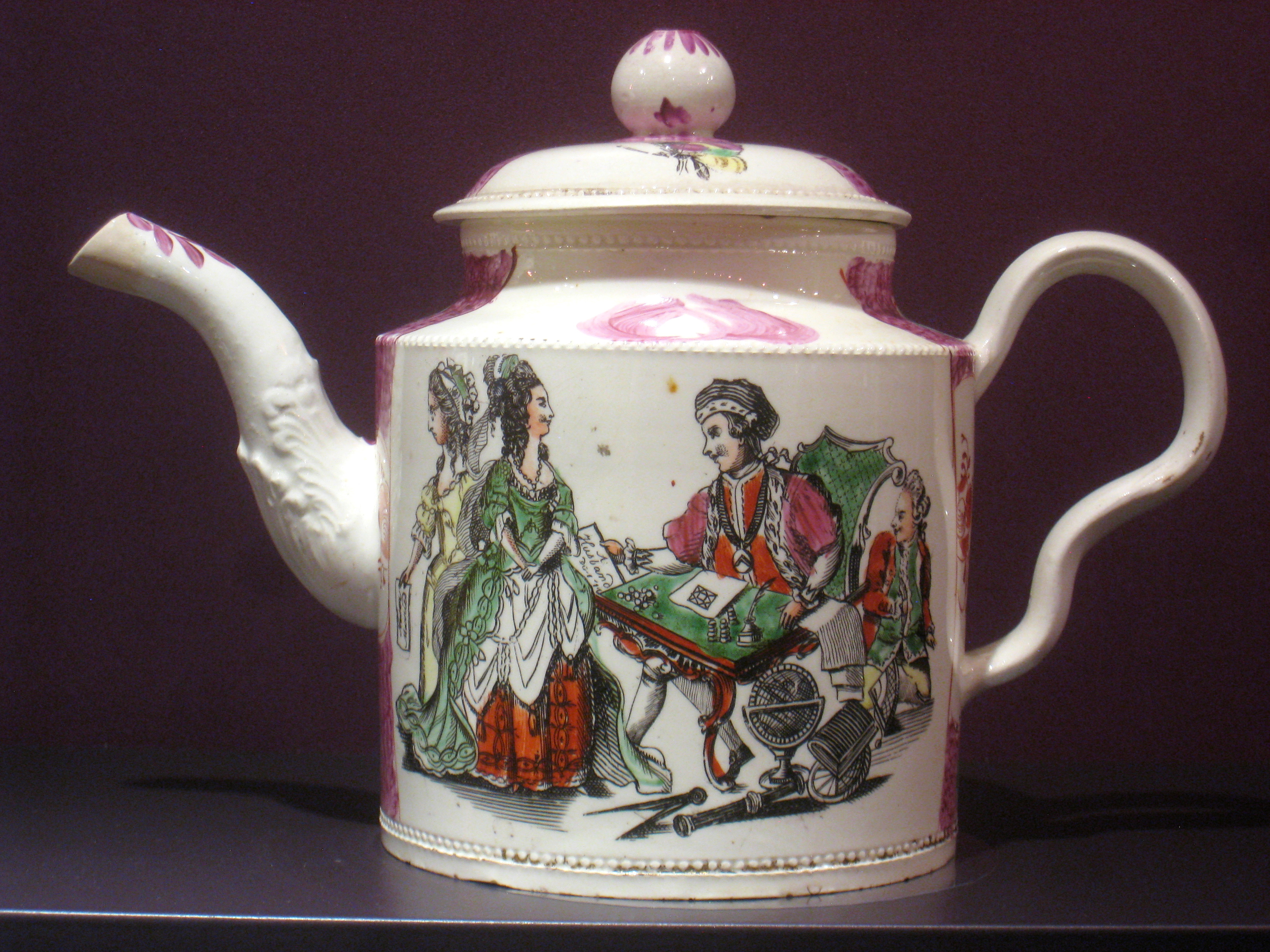
Teapot with scene of a fortune-teller. Printed black outline with manual enamel colours. 1762–82

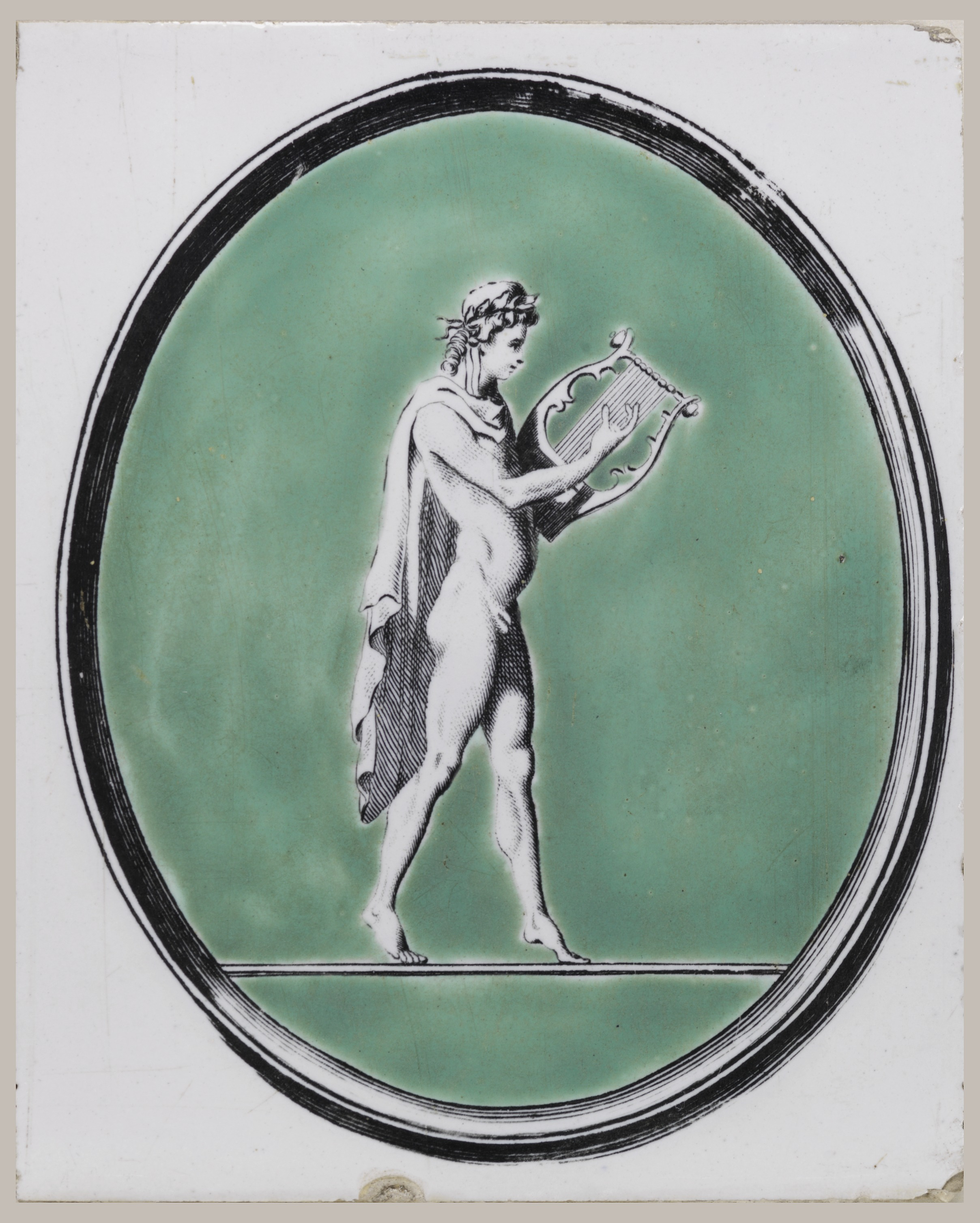
Tile with Orpheus or Apollo, c. 1780, the green painted

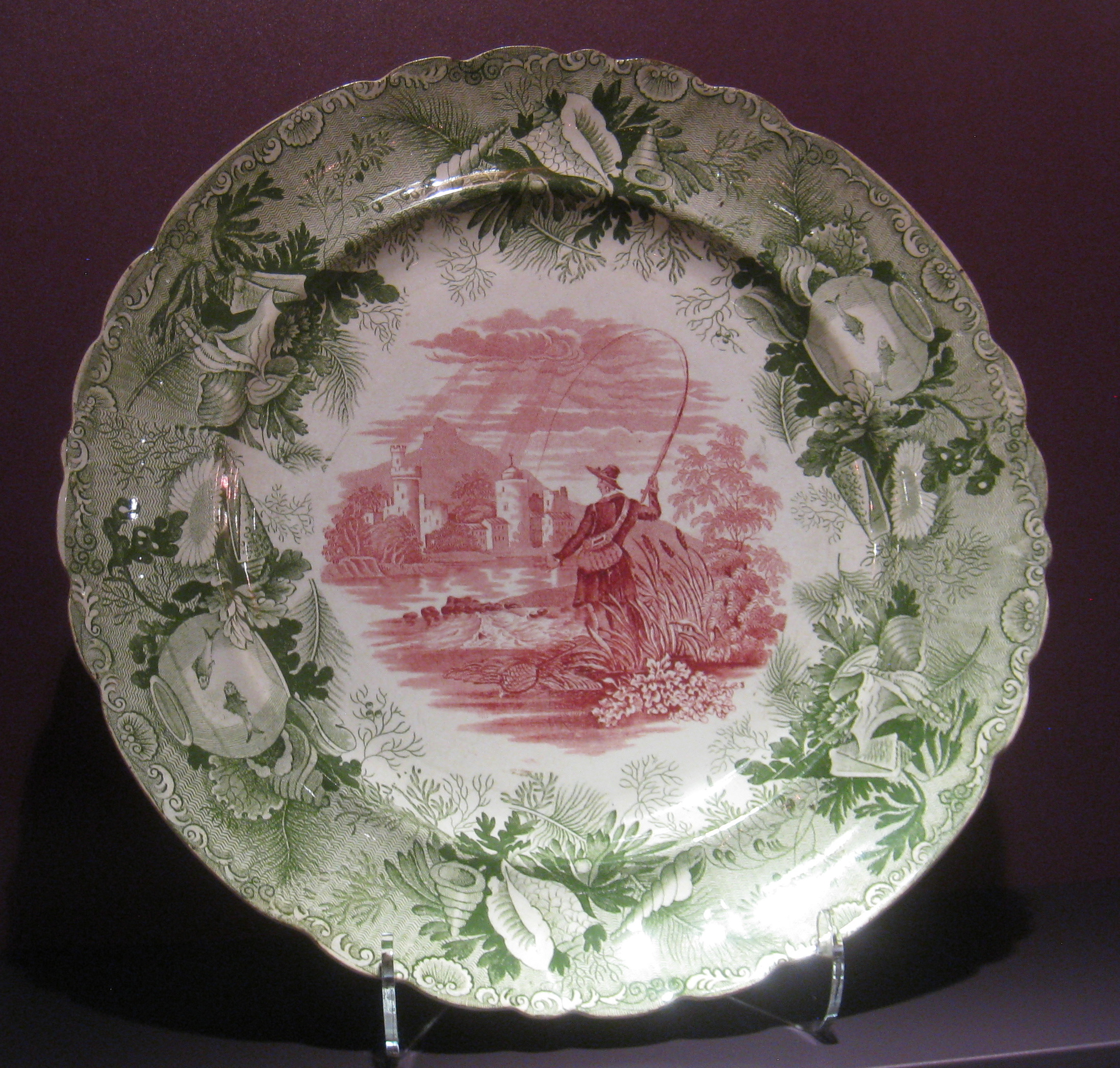
Plate using two transfers, puce and green, c. 1830, Enoch Wood & Co.

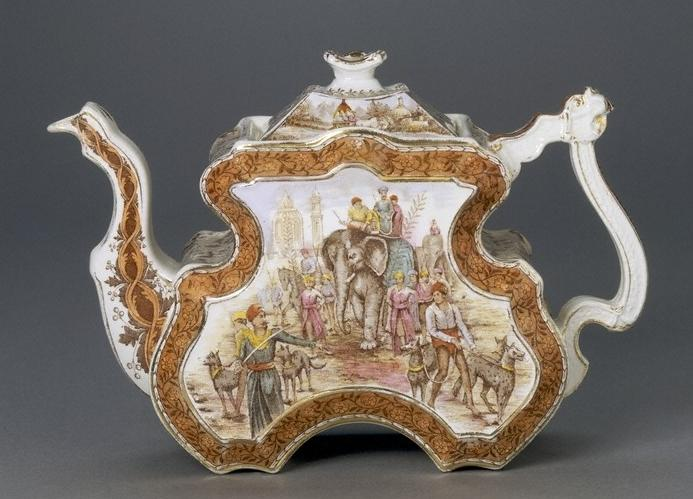
Polychrome teapot, 1896, Burgess & Leigh

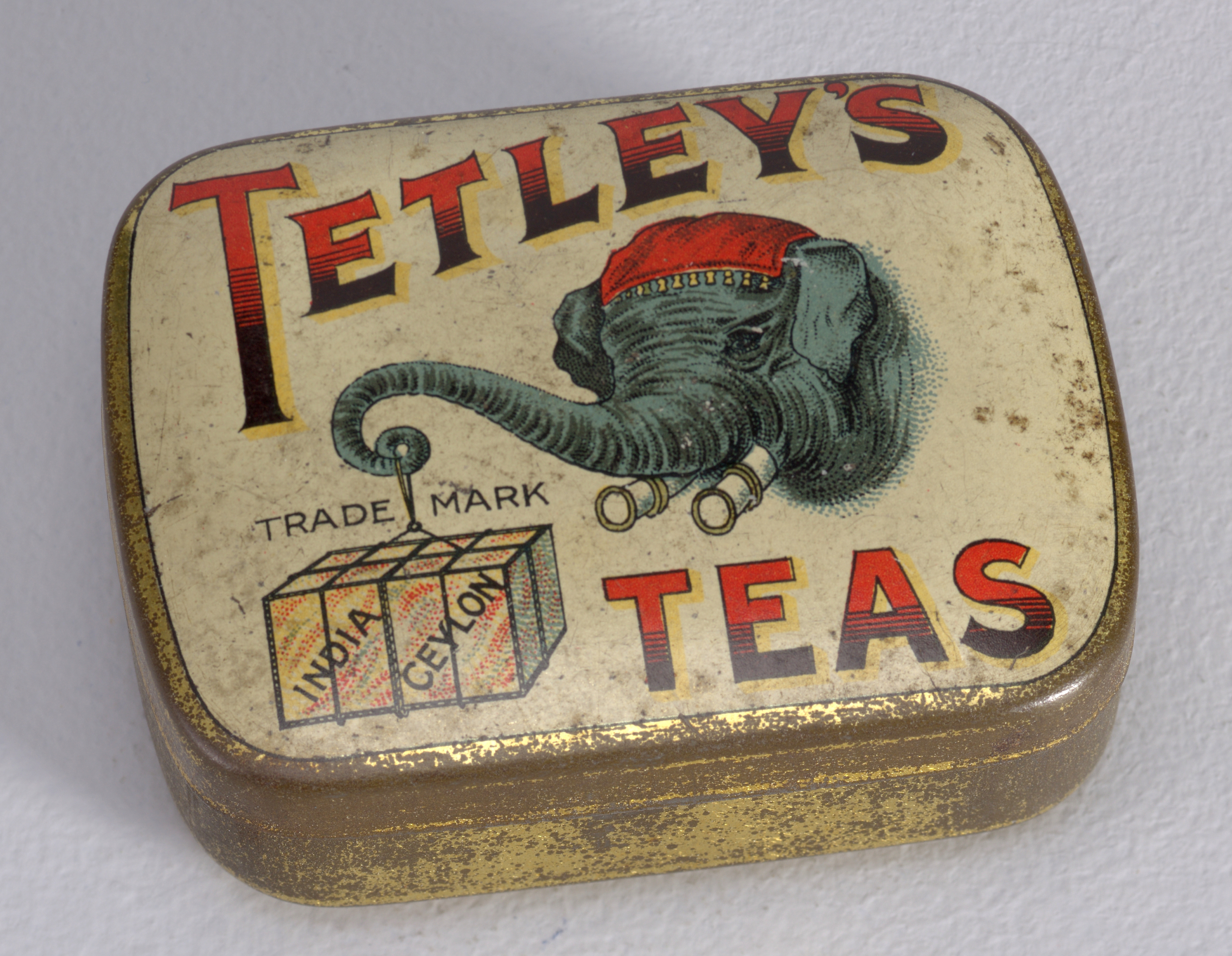
Advertising metal matchbox, British, late 19th century

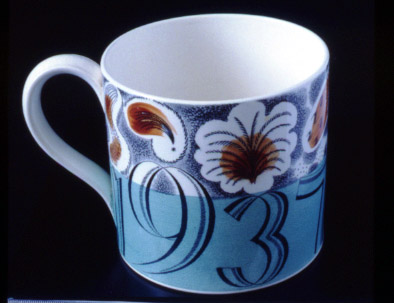
Modern colour printing – 1937 Coronation mug by Eric Ravilious for Wedgwood

== Design history ==
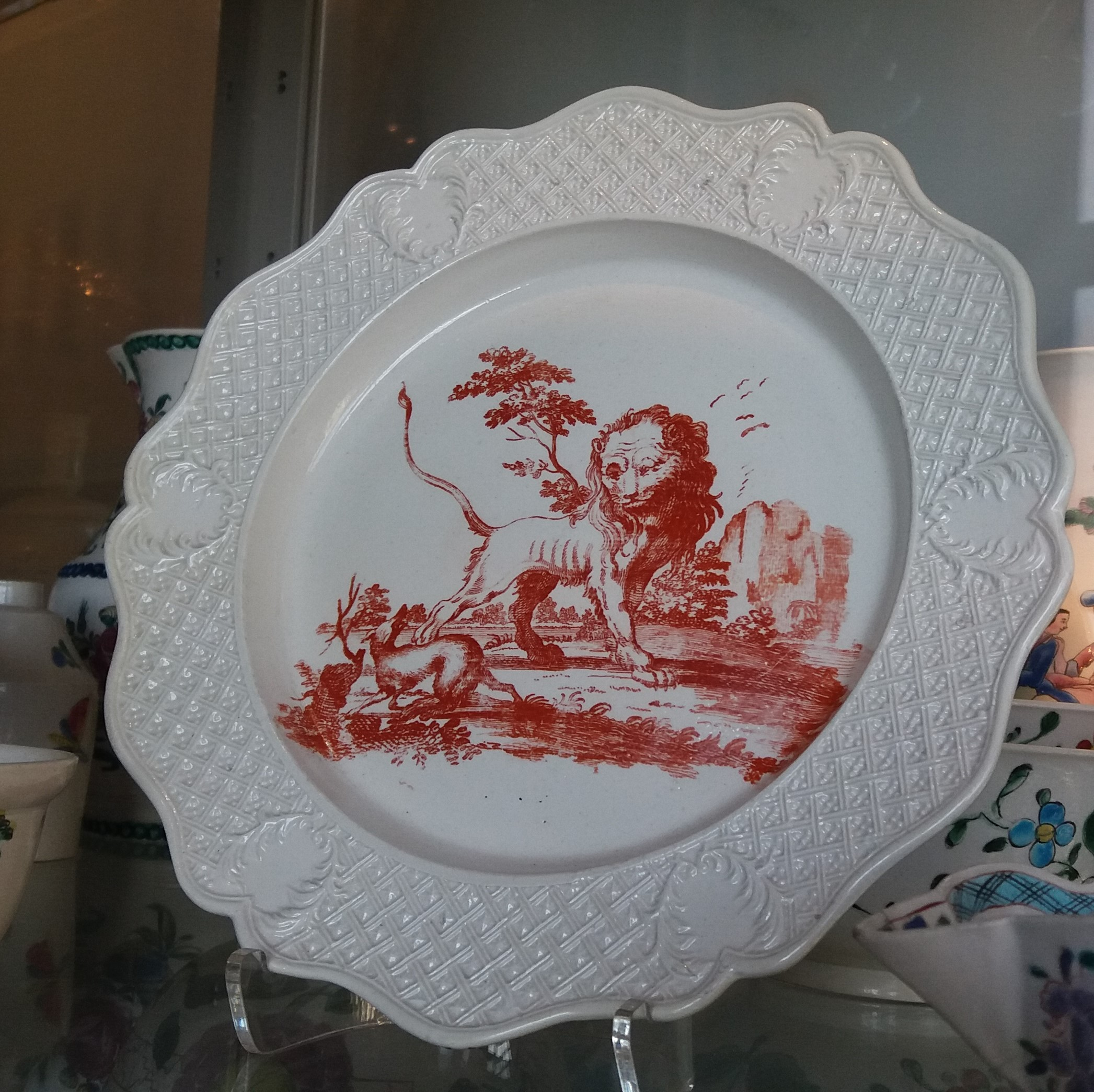
Staffordshire plate with a scene from Aesop, c. 1760

The pottery and printmaking worlds were already closely related, with large numbers of prints being copied by painters on pottery, especially porcelain, for which prints, including book illustrations, were the main source of images. Early scenes, mostly relatively small and on larger pieces occupying only the centre of the piece, included genteel or pastoral couples or small groups, landscapes, classical ruins, ships and portraits, especially of the military heroes of the Seven Years' War of 1756–63. All these came from the existing repertoire of china painting, with scenes from Aesop the most popular literary references.

Transfer-printed English wares are recorded in New York by 1776, and North America became an important market. By this time transfer-printing on the refined earthenwares such as creamware had become common. Large numbers of designs celebrated the new republic and in particular George Washington, with elaborate decorations around the central image as the century came to an end.

One particularly distinctive type of transferware, with an all-over floral pattern, is called chintz pottery, or chintzware.

== History ==
=== Italy ===
Although England dominated the history of commercial transfer printing, the technique had first been used in Italy. A few maiolica pieces, probably from around Turin, mix printed and painted elements in their decoration. They date to the late 17th century, or possibly the early 18th; four surviving pieces are known. Between about 1749 and 1752, just at the time of the earliest English printed, the Doccia porcelain factory near Florence also used transfer printing. They also experimented with stencils, and some pieces mix these techniques. About 50 pieces are known to survive.

=== England ===
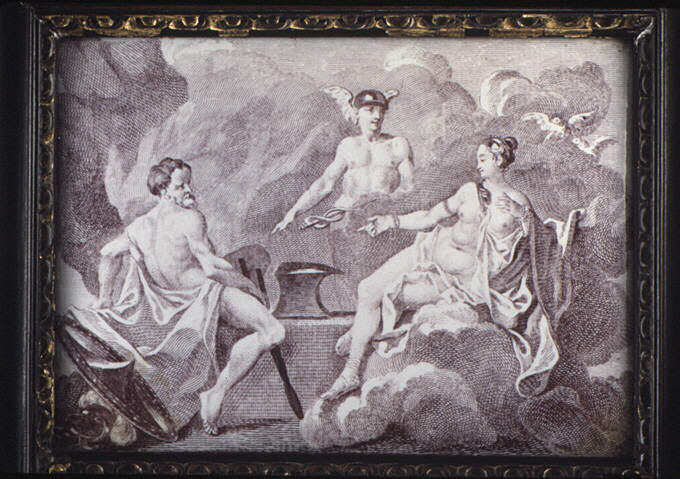
Battersea enamel, Venus Begging Arms From Vulcan, 1753-56

In the 1750s three men made significant advances in the application of printed decoration to ceramic surfaces; it does not seem likely that they were aware of the Italian precedents. Most early uses were on expensive porcelain wares, in contrast to the 19th century, when it was much more used on earthenwares. Initially, all pieces were overglaze printed. A single Chelsea porcelain plate survives in the British Museum, which has a transfer-printed design and the "raised anchor" form of the Chelsea mark, indicating a date between 1750 and 1752. A Swiss enamel artist also records seeing printing being done at an unidentified factory near to (but different from) the Chelsea works, during a visit to London that ended in late 1752.

In 1751 John Brooks, an Irish engraver then based in Birmingham, petitioned for a patent for “printing, impressing, and reversing upon enamel and china from engraved, etched and mezzotinted plates and from cuttings on wood and metal...” He was primarily concerned with printed decoration on enamels; boxes, plaques, medallions, etc. His patent application failed and he moved from Birmingham to London where he continued to unsuccessfully apply for patents. He was involved in early printing on enamels at Battersea in London, and probably Bilston near Birmingham.

Printing on enamel probably began around 1753 (a letter of Horace Walpole dated 7 September 1755 mentions a printed Battersea box), and by around 1756 his process was being used on some Bow porcelain, although the results were not excellent, perhaps as the glaze was "too soft and fusible", giving a tendency to blur the image. The colours of the 1750s were a "purplish or brownish black" or a "beautiful warm brick-red". By around 1760 there was some underglaze printing in blue.

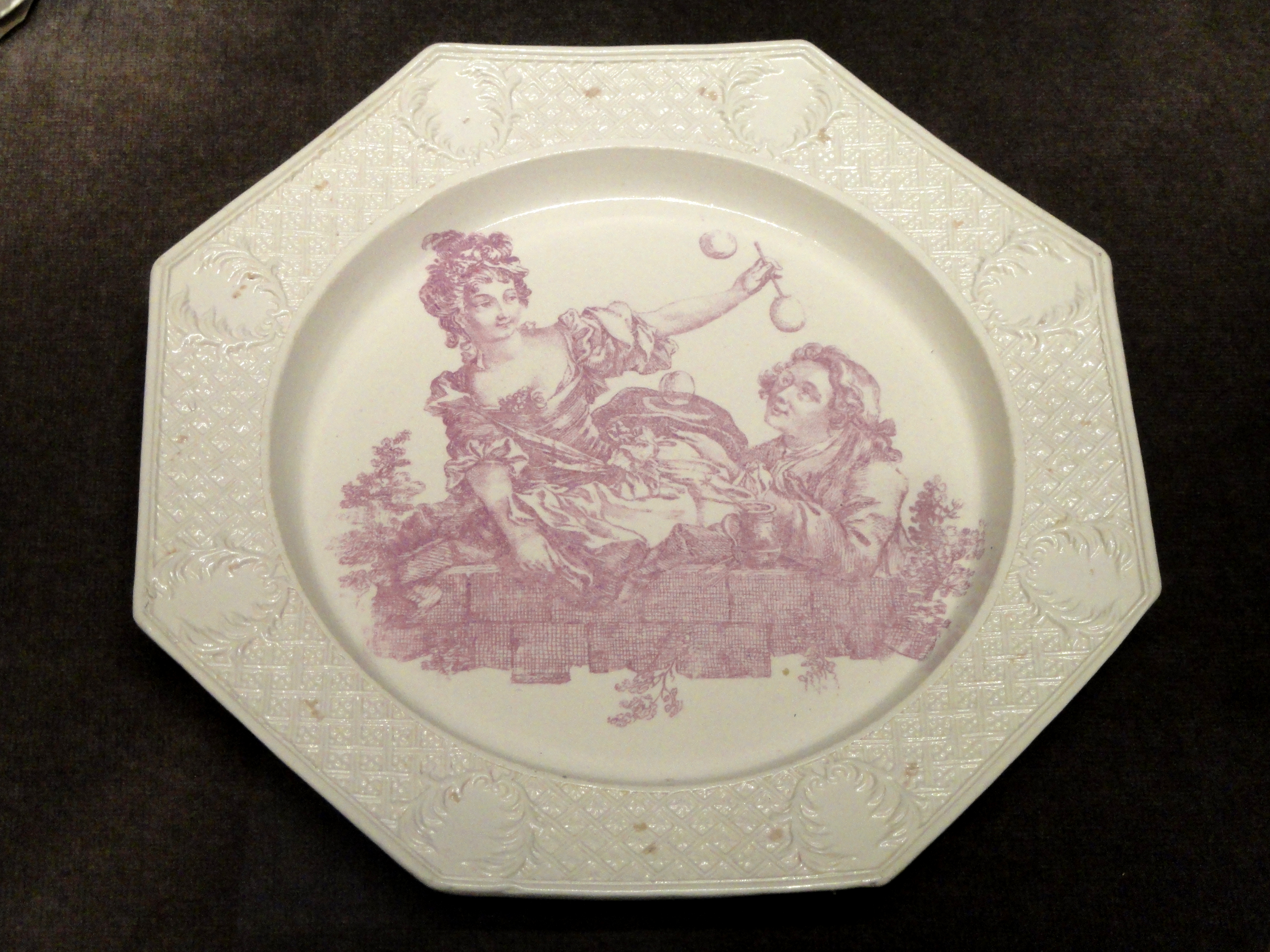
Blowing Soap Bubbles, about 1760-1770, Staffordshire, salt-glaze earthenware.

Five years after Brooks's first patent attempt, in 1756, John Sadler (in partnership with Guy Green) claimed in a patent affidavit that they had spent the past seven years perfecting a process for printing on tiles and that they could "print upwards of Twelve hundred Earthen Ware Tiles of different patterns " within a period of 6 hours. Sadler and Green printed in Liverpool, where their trade included overglaze printing on tin-glazed earthenware, porcelain, and creamware.

Transfer printing on porcelain at the Worcester porcelain factory in the 1750s is usually associated with Robert Hancock, an etcher and engraver, who signed some pieces and had also worked for Bow. Richard and Josiah Holdship, the managers of Worcester, were very supportive and involved with Hancock's work. By the mid-1750s the Worcester factory was producing both underglaze prints in blue and overglaze prints, predominately in black. Some printed pieces were in complicated shapes and included gilding, showing that the technique was at this point regarded as suitable for luxury products.

From 1842 the United Kingdom Patent Office introduced a system of registered marks, usually impressed or printed on the underside of pieces. Transfer-printed designs were easily registered by submitting the transfers printed on paper. The technology of transfer printing spread to Asia as well. Kawana ware in Japan developed in the late Edo period and was a type of blue-and-white porcelain.

Burleigh, made in Burslem, Stoke-on-Trent, is the last pottery in the world to still use transfer printing on its ceramics.

== Manufacturers ==
Major 19th- or 20th-century English manufacturers include Crown Ducal, Enoch Wood & Sons, Royal Staffordshire, Royal Crownford, Alfred Meakin (Tunstall), Spode, Johnson Brothers, and Mason's. The process was popular in other countries including Germany.

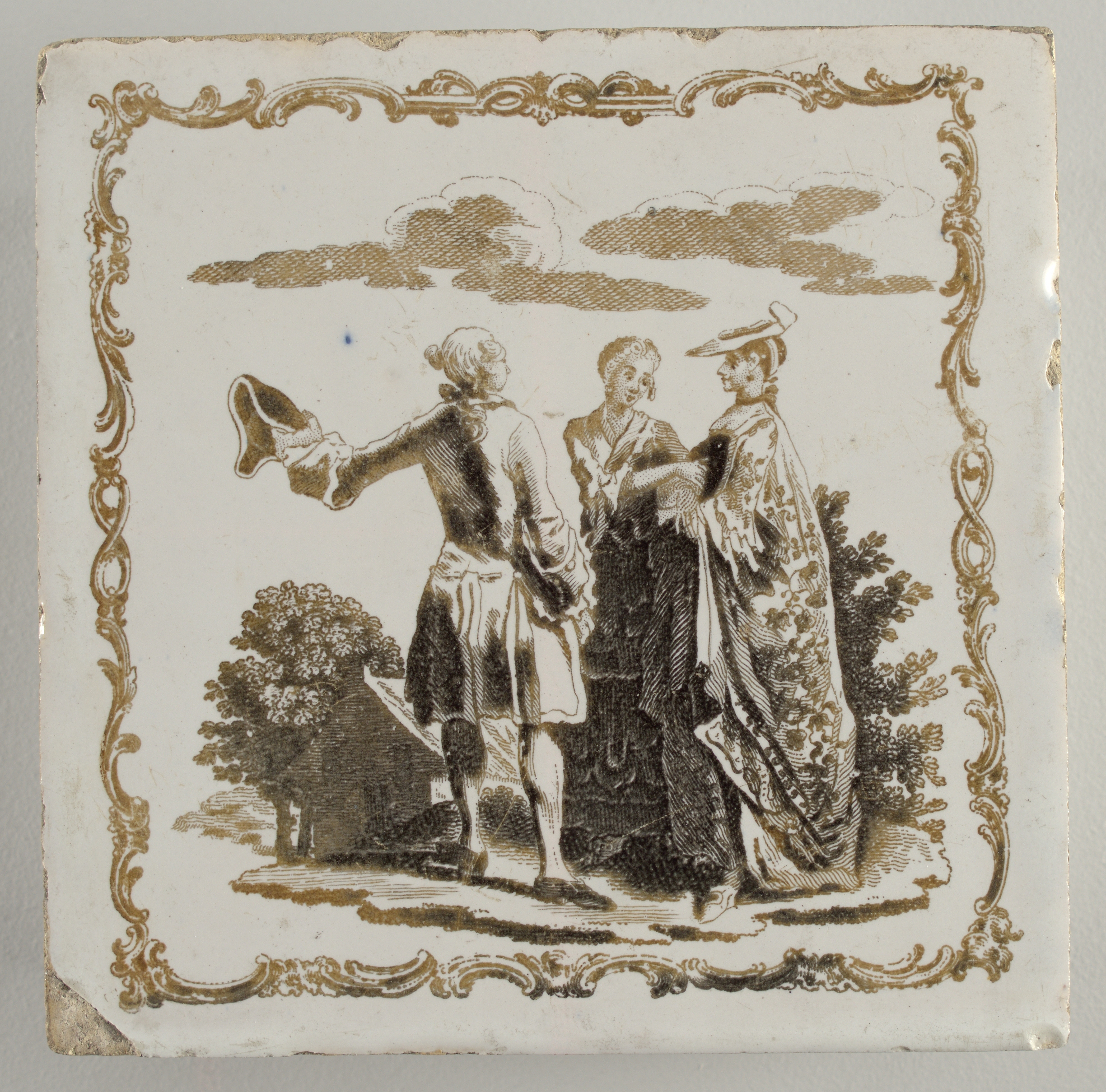
Sadler and Green tile, 1760

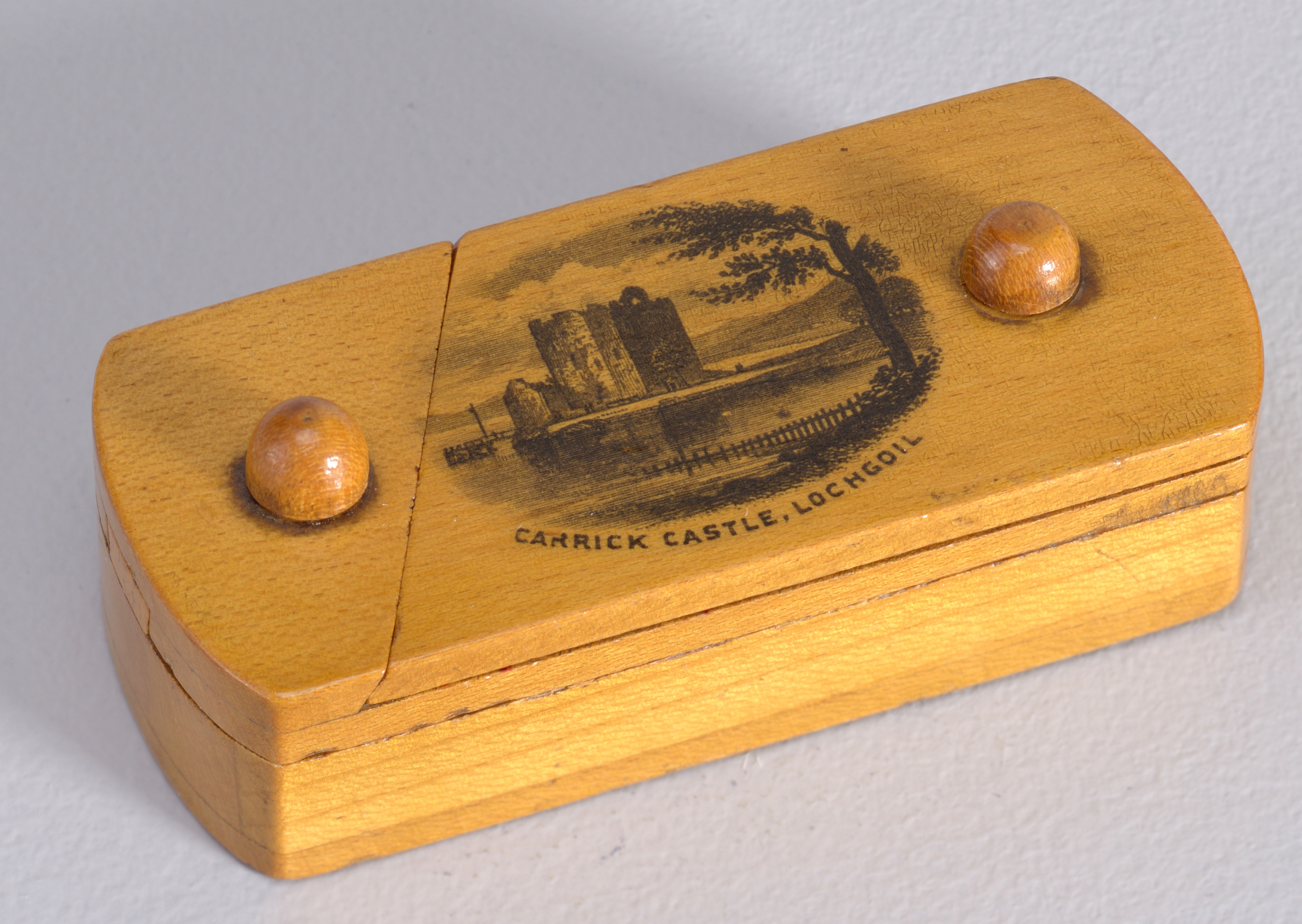
Wooden matchbox, British, c. 1900

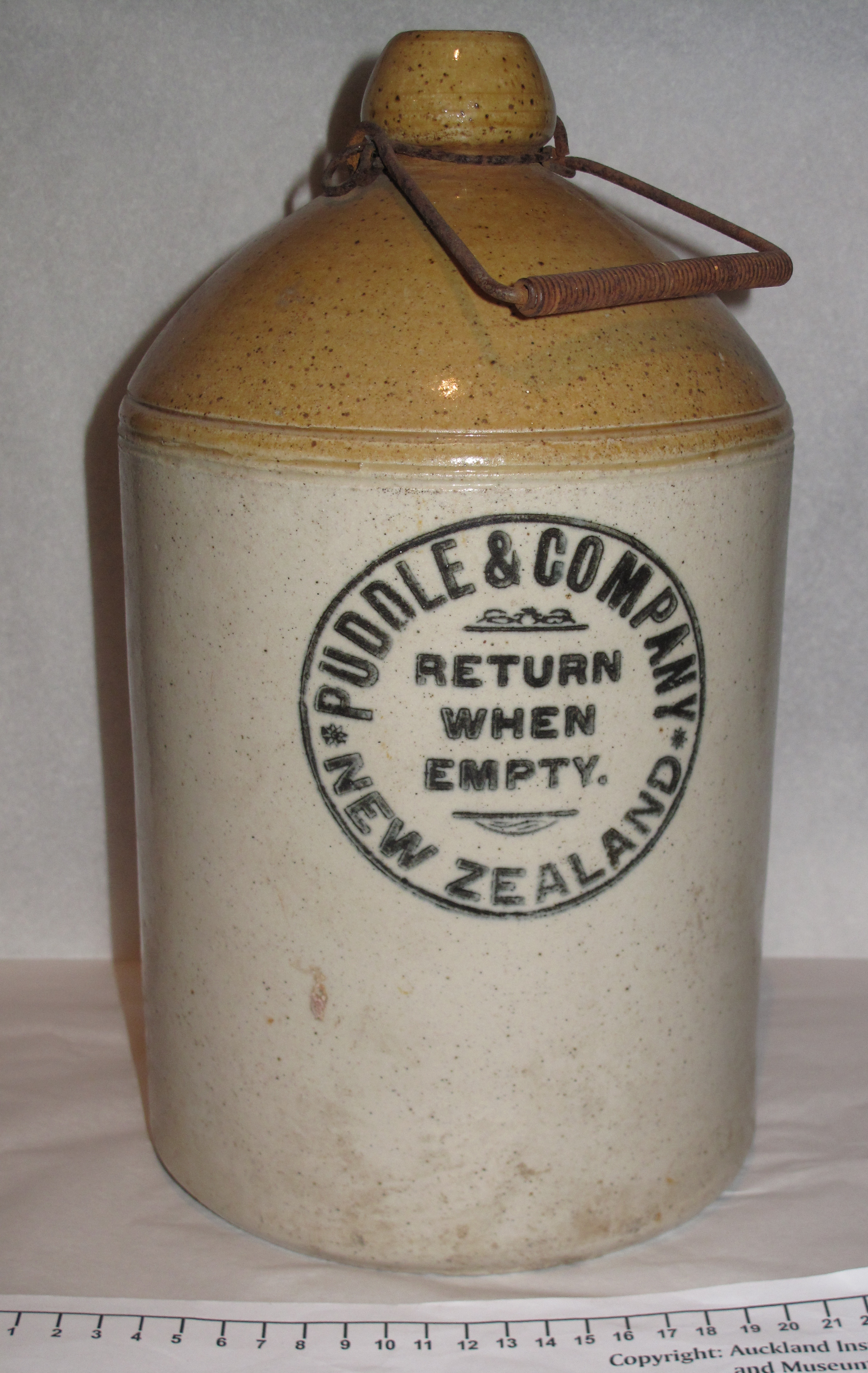
Practical printing on a stoneware New Zealand jar

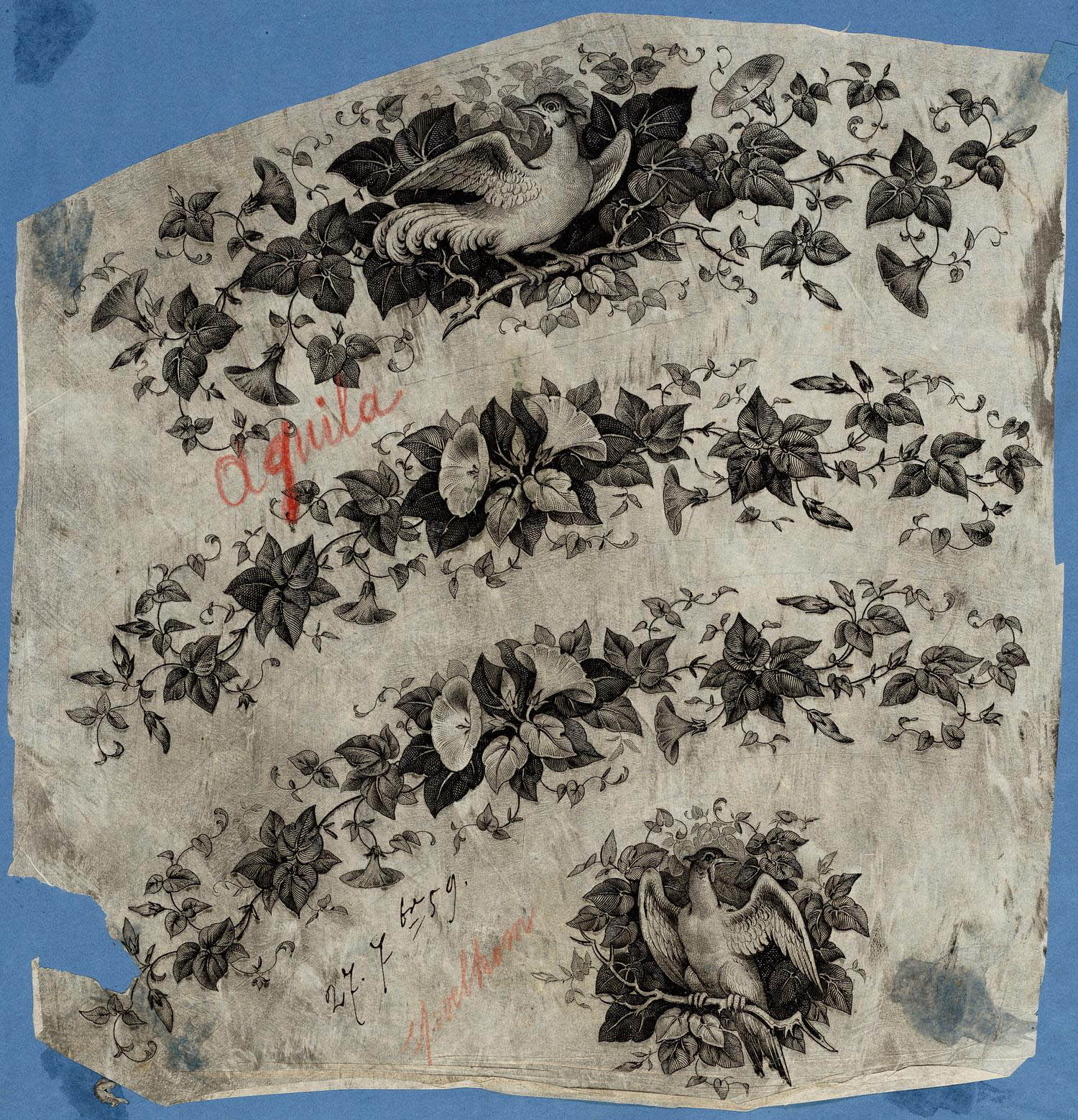
Paper print of transfers, Dutch, 1859

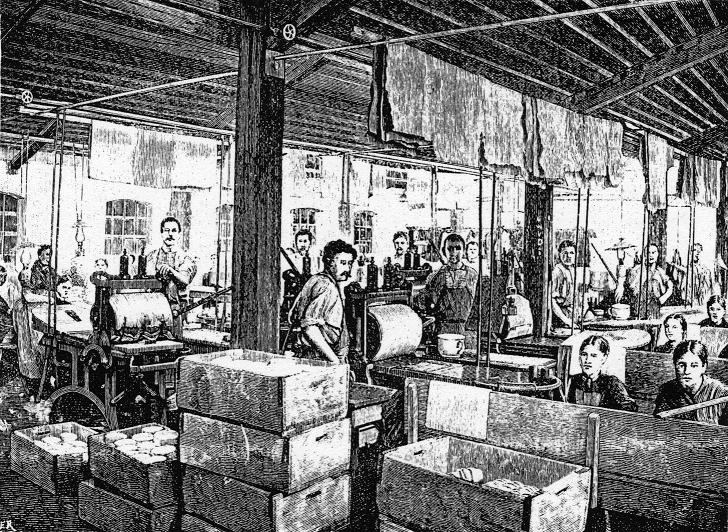
Transfer printing department of earthenware factory, Societe Ceramique, Maastricht
