= Robert Minton (cricketer) =

English cricketer

Personal information
- Full name: Robert Samuel Minton
- Born: 4 January 1899; Kensington, London, England
- Died: 3 August 1928 (aged 29); Three Bridges, Sussex, England
- Batting: Unknown

Domestic team information
- Years: Team
- 1919: Sussex

Career statistics
Competition	First-class
Matches	1
Runs scored	24
Batting average	12.00
100s/50s	–/–
Top score	24
Balls bowled	–
Wickets	–
Bowling average	–
5 wickets in innings	–
10 wickets in match	–
Best bowling	–
Catches/stumpings	–/–
- Source: Cricinfo, 12 February 2012

Robert Samuel Minton (4 January 1899 – 3 August 1928) was an English cricketer. Minton's batting style is unknown. He was born at Kensington, London, and was educated at Brighton College.

Minton made a single first-class appearance for Sussex against Northamptonshire at the County Ground, Northampton, in the 1919 County Championship. Northamptonshire won the toss and elected to bat first, posting a total of 410. In reply, Sussex could only manage 125, with Minton making 24 runs before he was dismissed by Albert Wright. His score was the second highest individual score in Sussex's innings. Forced to follow-on, Sussex improved in their second-innings to make 365, though Minton himself was dismissed without scoring by William Wells. Northamptonshire went on to win the match by 8 wickets, in what was Minton's only major appearance for Sussex.

He committed suicide near Three Bridges in Sussex on 3 August 1928, having thrown himself from the first-class compartment of a train on the Brighton Main Line. He had up to that point been employed as a police constable.
