= Josiah Spode =

Founder of the Spode pottery works (1733-1797)

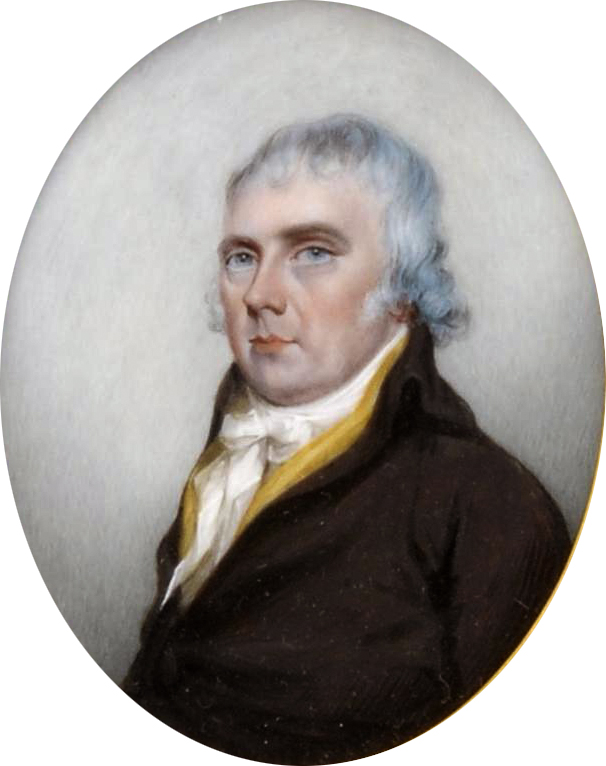
Josiah Spode I (1733–1797) (N. Freese)

Josiah Spode (23 March 1733 – 18 August 1797) was an English potter and the founder of the English Spode pottery works which became famous for the high quality of its wares. He is often credited with the establishment of blue underglaze transfer printing in Staffordshire in 1781–84, and with the definition and introduction in c. 1789–91 of the improved formula for bone china (a form of soft-paste porcelain) which thereafter remained the standard for all English wares of this kind.

== Early life ==
Josiah Spode was born in Lane Delph, Fenton, Staffordshire. Spode was a pauper's son and also a pauper's orphan at the age of six. In 1745 his elder sister Ann married Ambrose Gallimore, who in 1754 obtained the lease of the Caughley porcelain factory near Broseley. Spode was taken on as a worker by potter Thomas Whieldon in November (Martinmas) 1749, and remained with him until 1754. In that year, on 8 September, Josiah married Ellen Finley at Stoke-on-Trent, and his eldest son Josiah (II) was born in 1755. It was in 1754 that Josiah Wedgwood became the business partner of Thomas Whieldon, an arrangement which continued until 1759. Spode had worked alongside Wedgwood and with the celebrated potter Aaron Wood (father of Enoch Wood) under Whieldon's tuition, and was with Whieldon at a high point of production there.

As a family man Josiah Spode was an accomplished violinist, and he and his wife had further children Samuel (1757), Mary (1759), Ellen (1762) Sarah, William (1770), Ann (1772), and Elizabeth (1777). The suggestion that he took over the factory of Ralph Baddeley and Thomas Fletcher during the late 1750s and early 1760s is now discounted. After John Turner (1737–87) left Stoke for Lane End in 1759 or 1762, Spode may have carried on the factory of William Banks, Turner's partner and former master at Stoke. It is said that Spode took over the Stoke factory in about 1770, and recorded that he bought the rights under a Turner family patent in 1805. The production there was of creamware with blue painted decoration as well as white stoneware in the manner of John Turner: black ware was also made and a printing press for black transfer printing was maintained. Spode was powerfully influenced by Turner's work. He was engaged as master potter, but it is not known whether his work there was consecutive or sporadic, and there may be confusion between him and his son of the same name.

== Spode's Works ==
Spode rented a factory in Church Street, Stoke-on-Trent in 1767. There he was in financial partnership with William Tomlinson (a solicitor), and in 1772 he took on a pottery at Shelton, Staffordshire with Thomas Mountford as his backer. In 1776 he bought the old pottery works at Stoke that had formerly been the property of William Banks while in partnership with John Turner. This was the same site on which the later Spode factory arose, which continued operating into modern times (circa 2008). Josiah's business in creamware and in pearlware (a fine white-glazed earthenware) was very successful.

In 1775 Josiah's eldest son Josiah (II) married Elizabeth, the niece of John Barker, a manufacturing potter of Fenton, Staffordshire. Josiah the elder took this opportunity to establish the regular London business. Between 1775 and 1782 Josiah II and Elizabeth moved between Longton, Staffordshire and Cripplegate, London, where he was doubtless manager of the Fore Street warehouse under the guidance of William Taylor Copeland, his father's friend and London partner. During this time the young couple had sons William (1776) and Josiah (1777) and daughters Eliza (1778), Sabia (1780) and Mary (1781). Elizabeth Spode died in London in 1782. Josiah the elder became a Freeman of the City of London in 1778 and was a Liveryman of the Spectacle Makers' Company.

Josiah Spode I is credited with the introduction of underglaze blue transfer printing into the Staffordshire potteries in 1781–84. More precisely he was the first to introduce a perfected method to Stoke, (with the help of engraver Thomas Lucas and printer James Richards, formerly of the Caughley Pottery Works, Shropshire), using improvements recently developed at nearby Shelton by or for Ralph Baddeley.

Spode the elder also, between 1788 and 1793, established and finalised the formula for English bone china, for whereas bone ash had previously been added in other factories to the fabric in proportions of roughly 40%, Spode simplified and greatly improved the recipe (see Spode).

Spode had various commercial premises in London, originally in Fore Street, Cripplegate. However, the warehouse was finally settled in the former Theatre Royal, no 5 Portugal Street, Lincoln's Inn Fields, which his firm occupied from 1795 to 1848, when the building was razed. (This had been the venue of the first performance of the Beggar's Opera in 1727.)

Josiah Spode the elder died in 1797 and his wife Ellen died in 1802, aged 76. They are buried in Stoke-on-Trent churchyard.

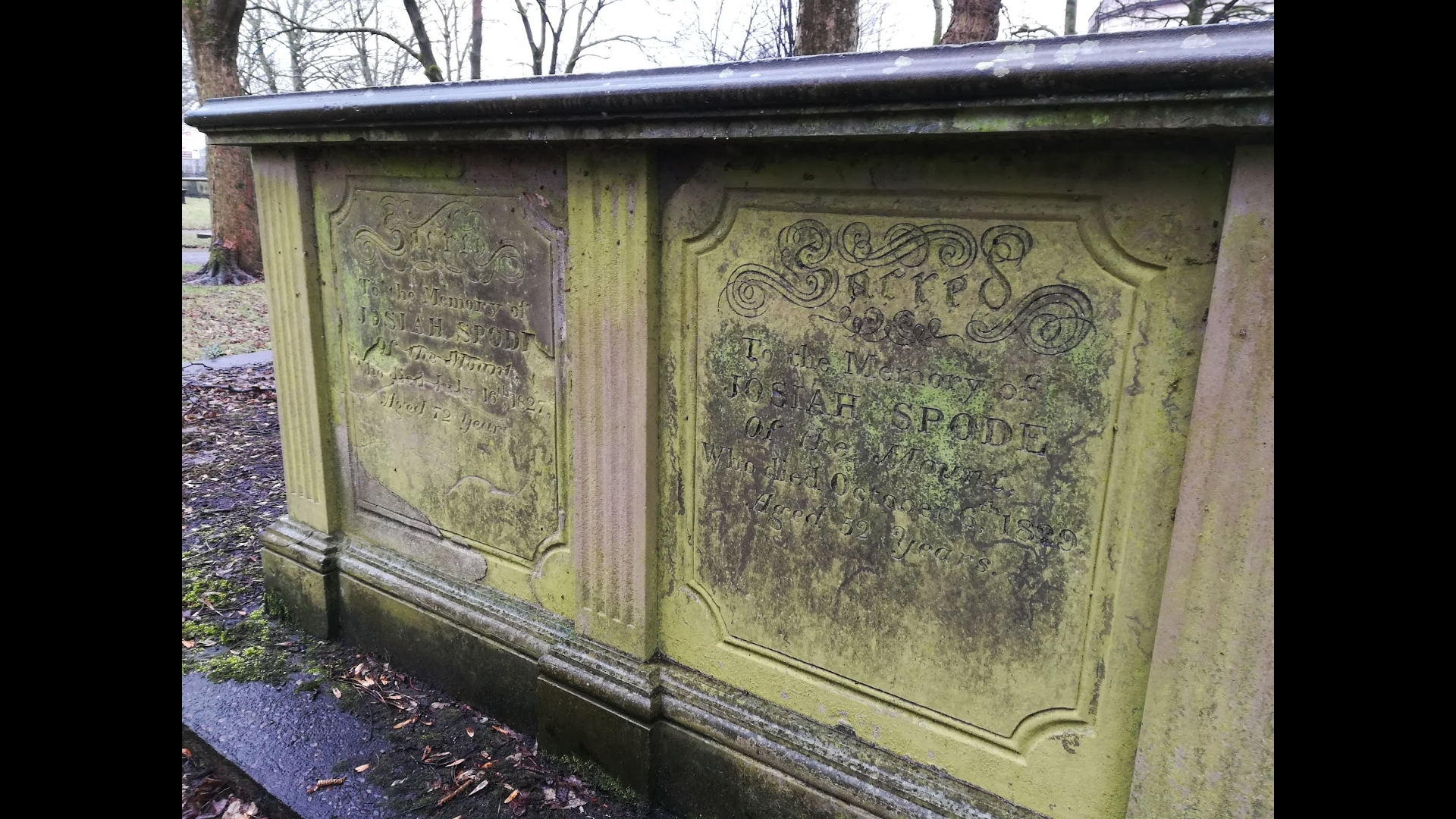
Josiah Spode family tomb, St Peter Vincula church, Stoke-on-Trent.

== Successors ==
Josiah Spode II (1755–1827), Josiah's elder son, succeeded to the business in 1797. He was magnificently prepared for the role, an experienced salesman as well as a potter, having gained an invaluable knowledge of marketing in fashionable London. He was active in the North Staffordshire Pitt Club and entered politics. In 1798 he raised and with the rank of Captain commanded the Loyal Pottery Volunteer Cavalry, the mounted division of the Loyal Staffordshire Pottery Association of Hanley, Shelton and Stoke, affiliated to the Staffordshire Yeomanry, until it was stood down at the Peace of Amiens in 1802. He was granted a coat-of-arms in 1804. In 1811, with James Caldwell of Linley Wood, he successfully opposed a move by government to impose taxation on the work of the Potteries.

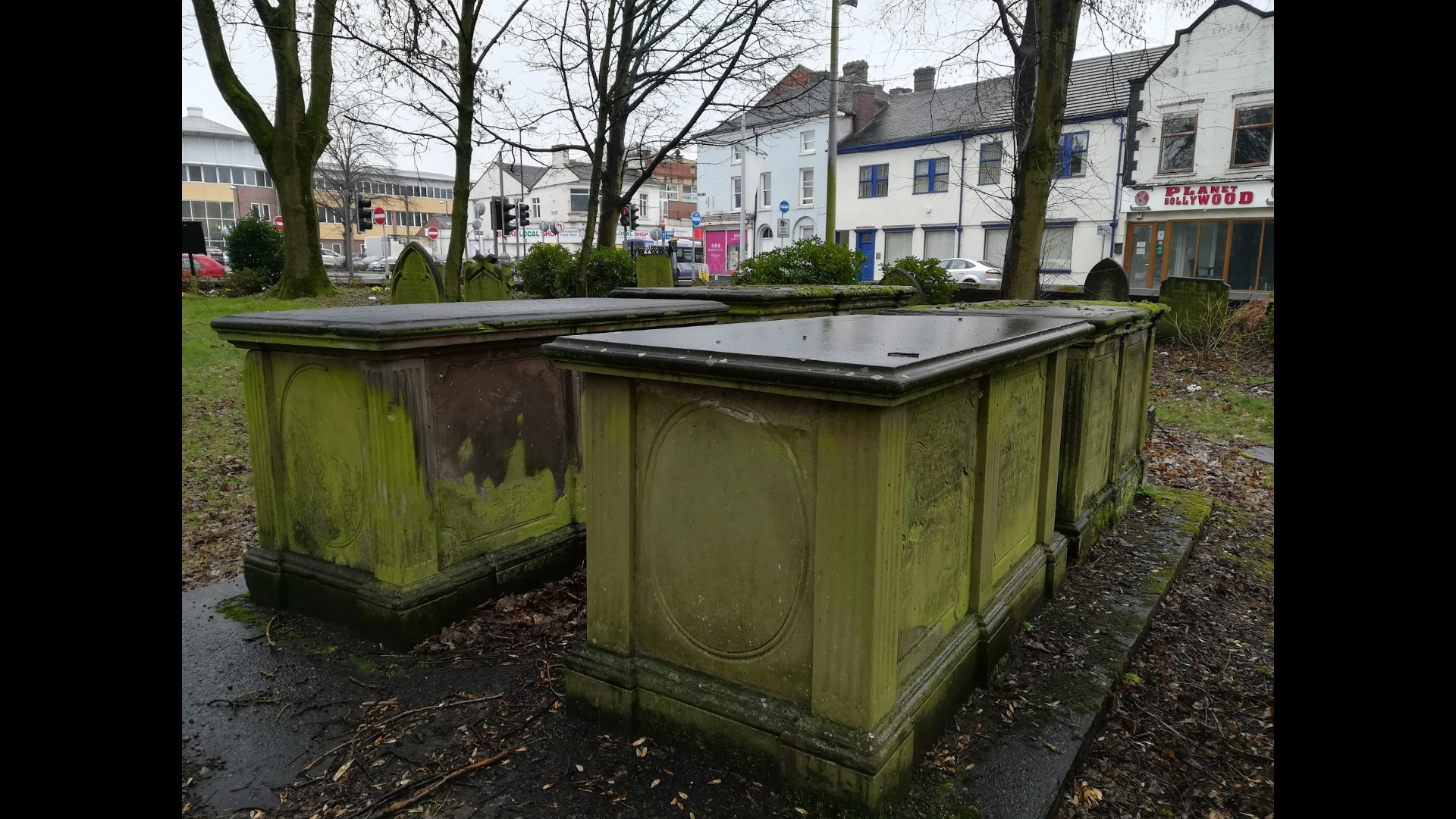
Spode family tombs.

Josiah II, who was a flautist, was father of Josiah III (1777), and grandfather of Josiah IV, a convert to Roman Catholicism, who founded Hawkesyard Priory near Rugeley. His daughter Sabia married George Whieldon at Stoke in 1809.

Samuel Spode (born 1757), Josiah I's second son, inherited the Foley factory which his father had built for him at Lane End, which produced salt-glazed wares up to the end of the eighteenth century. Josiah Spode (born 1790), the son of Samuel and his wife Sarah, emigrated to Tasmania where he held a position as Controller of Convicts.

After several generations under the guidance of the Copeland family, the Spode name is now owned by the Portmeirion pottery company, which now produces some of the former Spode patterns.

== See also ==
- Spode
- Samuel Spode
- Spode Museum
- William Henry Goss
- W.T.Copeland

== Sources ==
- Josiah Spode biography, from the Spode Museum.
- Arthur Hayden, Spode and His Successors (Cassell, London 1925).
- Alexandre Brongniart, Traité des arts céramiques ou des poteries considerées dans leur histoire, leur pratique et leur théorie (3 vols) (Paris, Bechet et Mathias 1844).
- M.L. Solon, A Brief History of Old English Porcelain and its Manufactories; with an artistic, industrial, and critical appreciation of their productions. (Bemrose and Sons, London & Derby 1903)
- Arthur Church, English Porcelain made during the 18th century (HMSO 1905)
- Richard Burton, A History and Description of English Porcelain (Cassell, London 1902)
- Leonard Whitier, Spode, A History of the Family, Factory and Wares from 1733 to 1833 (Barrie & Jenkins, London 1970).
