= Bone china =

Porcelain composed of bone ash, feldspathic material, and kaolin

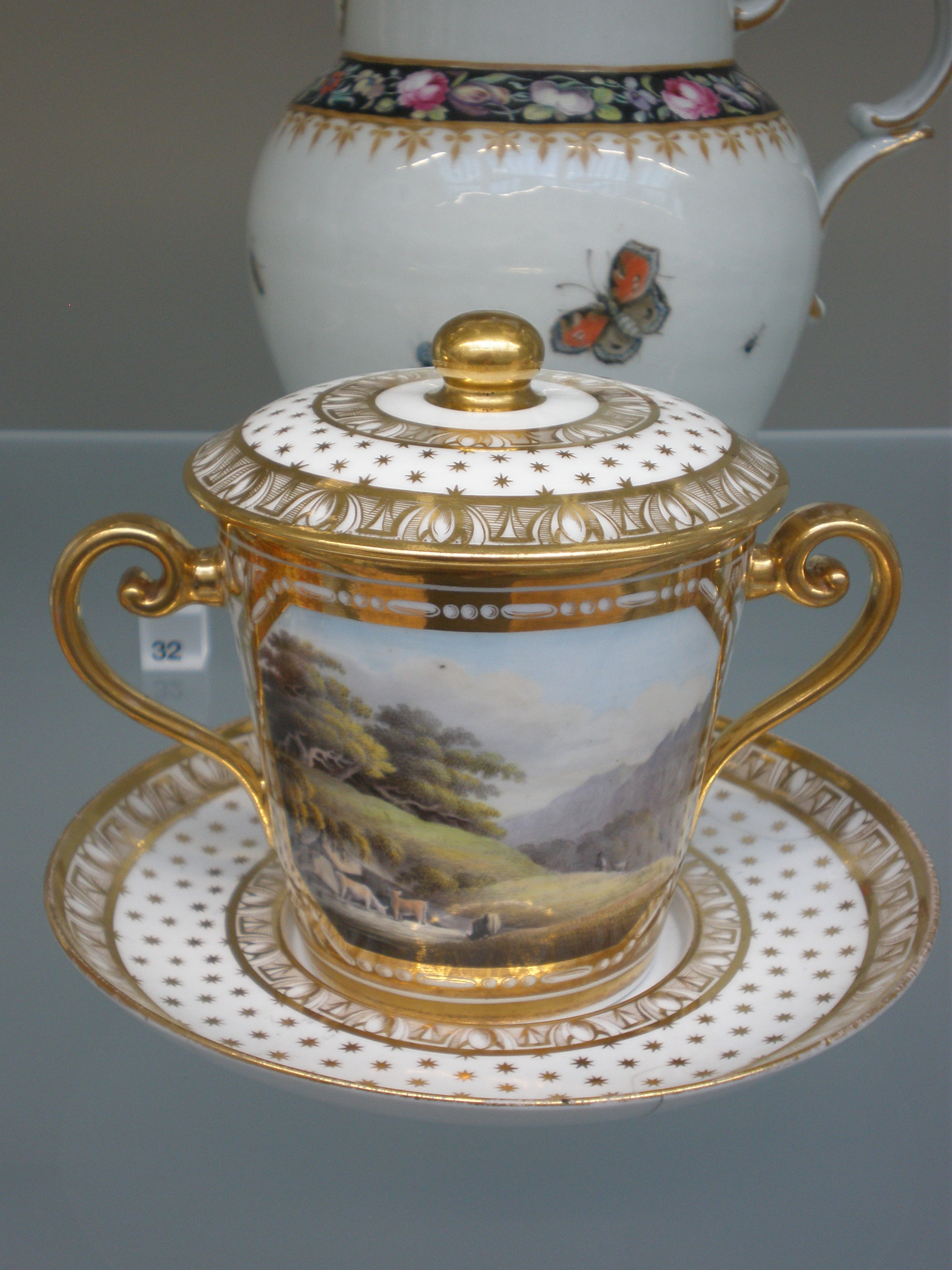
Staffordshire bone china covered chocolate cabinet cup, with enamels and gilding, c. 1815–20, Victoria and Albert Museum.

Bone china is a type of vitreous, translucent pottery, the raw materials for which include bone ash, feldspathic material and kaolin. It has been defined as "ware with a translucent body" containing a minimum of 30% of phosphate derived from calcined animal bone or calcium phosphate. Bone china is amongst the strongest of whiteware ceramics, and is known for its high levels of whiteness and translucency. Its high strength allows it to be produced in thinner cross-sections than other types of whiteware. Like stoneware, it is vitrified, but is translucent due to differing mineral properties.

In the mid-18th century, English potters had not succeeded in making hard-paste porcelain (as made in East Asia and Meissen porcelain), but found bone ash a useful addition to their soft-paste porcelain mixtures. This became standard at the Bow porcelain factory in London (operating from around 1747), and spread to some other English factories. The modern product was developed by the Staffordshire potter Josiah Spode in the early 1790s. Spode included kaolin, so his formula, sometimes called "Staffordshire bone-porcelain", was effectively hard-paste, but stronger, and versions were adopted by all the major English factories by around 1815.

From its initial development and up to the latter part of the 20th century, bone china was almost exclusively an English product, with production very largely localised in Stoke-on-Trent. Most major English firms made or still make it, including Spode, Royal Worcester, Royal Crown Derby, Royal Doulton, Wedgwood, and Mintons. In the 20th century it began to be made in other places, including Russia, China, and Japan. China is now the world's largest manufacturer.

In the UK, references to "china" or "porcelain" can refer to bone china, and "English porcelain" has been used as a term for it both in the UK and around the world.

== History ==
The first development of what would become known as bone china was made in 1748 by Thomas Frye at his Bow porcelain factory near Bow, East London. His factory was located very close to the cattle markets and slaughterhouses of London and Essex, and hence had easy access to animal bones. Frye used up to 45% bone ash in his formula to create what he called "fine porcelain".

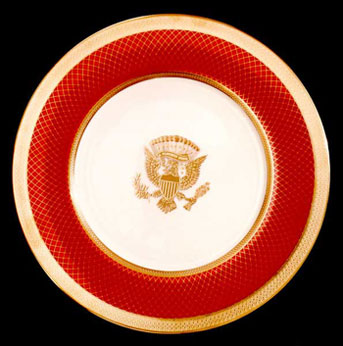
Plate from Ronald Reagan's state service for the White House, by Lenox

Josiah Spode in Stoke-on-Trent further developed the concept between 1789 and 1793, and introduced his "Stoke China" in 1796. He died suddenly the following year, and his son Josiah Spode II quickly rechristened the ware "bone china". Among his developments was to abandon Frye's procedure of calcining the bone together with some of the other raw body materials, instead calcining just the bone. Bone china quickly proved to be highly popular, leading to its production by other English pottery manufacturers. Both Spode's formula and his business were successful: his proportions of 6 parts bone ash, 4 parts china stone and 3.5 parts kaolin remains the basis of all bone china. It was only in 2009 that his company, Spode, went into receivership before eventually being purchased by Portmeirion Pottery.

== Production ==
=== Raw materials ===
The traditional formula for bone china is about 25% kaolin, 25% China stone and 50% bone ash.

The bone ash that is used in bone china has traditionally been made from cattle bones, which have a lower iron content. These bones are crushed before being degelatinised and then calcined at around 1,000 °C to produce bone ash. The ash is milled to a fine particle size. The kaolin component of the body is needed to give the unfired body a plasticity which allows pieces to be shaped. This mixture is then fired at around 1,200 °C. The raw materials for bone china are expensive, and the production is labour-intensive, which is why bone china maintains a luxury status and high prices.

The use of hydroxyapatite compounds, derived from rock sources, rather than bone ash has increased since the 1990s. If they are used appropriately, the resultant ceramic material conforms to accepted definitions of bone china, and the properties and appearance are indistinguishable from those using naturally derived bone ash.

== Mineralogy ==
Bone china consists of two crystalline phases, anorthite (CaAl_{2}Si_{2}O_{8}) and β-tricalcium phosphate/whitlockite (Ca_{3}(PO_{4})_{2}), embedded in a substantial amount of glass.

== Production locations ==
For almost 200 years from its development, bone china was almost exclusively produced in the UK; it was ignored by most European and Asian countries already making porcelain. During the middle part of the 20th century, manufacturers in other countries began production; the first to do so successfully were Japan's Noritake, Nikko and Narumi.

Lenox was the only major manufacturer of bone china in the United States, and supplied the presidential dinner service to the White House. The factory closed in March 2020.

Production in the Soviet Union started in 1969 at the Lomonosov Porcelain Factory.

In more recent years, production in China has expanded considerably, and the country is now the biggest producer of bone china in the world. Other countries producing considerable amounts of bone china are Bangladesh, India, Indonesia, Sri Lanka and Thailand.

Tangshan in Hebei province, is a hub for ceramic tableware production in China. The local manufacturers have a combined annual production capacity of bone china exceeding 100 million pieces.

Rajasthan became a hub for bone china in India, producing 16–17 tonnes per day in 2003. From the start of the first factory, Bengal Potteries, in 1964, bone china output from Indian factories had risen to 10,000 tonnes per year by 2009.

== Cultural issues ==
In the 21st century, so-called Islamic or halal bone china was developed using bone ash from halal animals.

Because animal bones are used in the production of bone china, vegetarians and vegans may avoid using or purchasing it. Porcelain manufactured without animal bones is sometimes called vegan porcelain.
