= William Greatbatch =

British potter (c. 1735–1813)

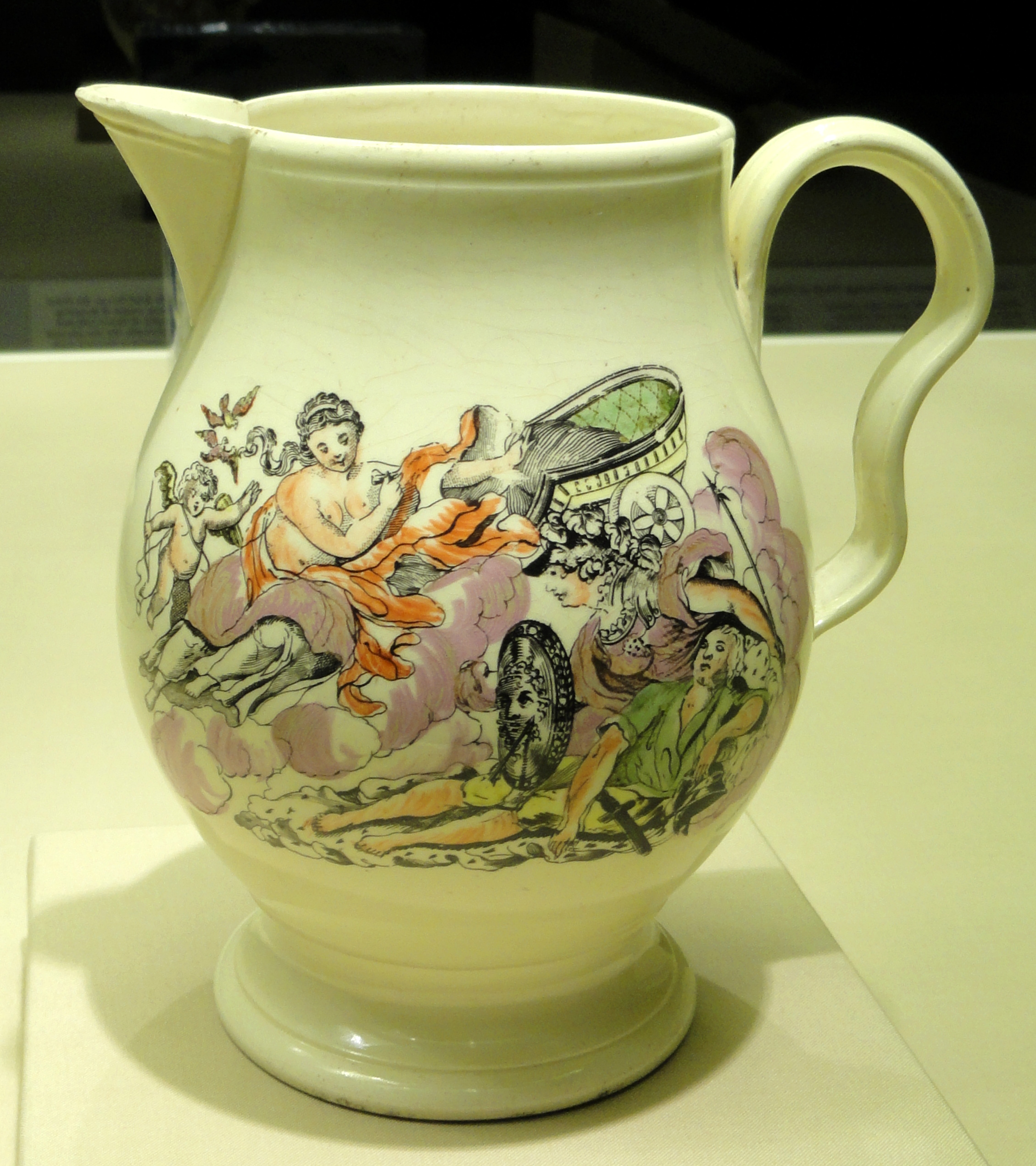
Jug by William Greatbatch, c. 1770–1782 in the Nelson Atkins Museum of Art.

William Greatbatch (circa 1735 - 29 April 1813) was a potter at Fenton, Staffordshire, from the mid-eighteenth to the beginning of the nineteenth centuries. Fenton was one of the six towns of the Staffordshire Potteries, which were joined in the early 20th century to become the city of Stoke-on-Trent in Staffordshire, England.

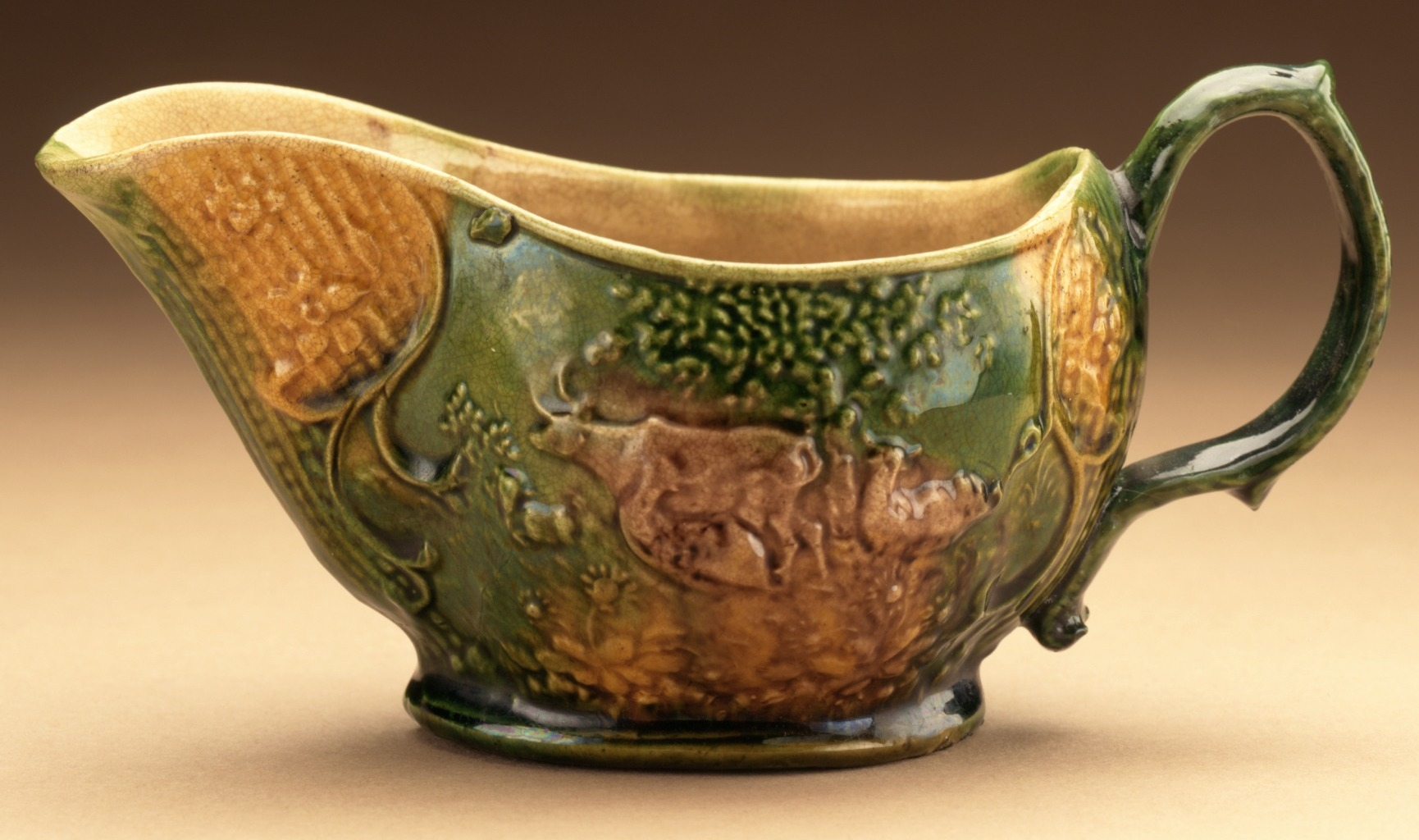
Cream jug modelled and made by Greatbach, c. 1765

North Staffordshire became a centre of ceramic production in the early 17th century, due to the local availability of clay, salt, lead and coal. The nature and scale of local pottery production changed dramatically during the course of the 18th century as part of the Industrial Revolution.

Greatbatch served as an apprentice to Thomas Whieldon at Fenton Vivian before setting up as an independent manufacturer. He developed and supplied wares to Josiah Wedgwood during a business partnership lasting some twenty years and later, following a bankruptcy, worked directly for Wedgwood at the Etruria works until his retirement.

Greatbatch was especially important as a designer and modeller of complicated patterns for tableware shapes, designing and making the moulds for Wedgwood and other potteries.

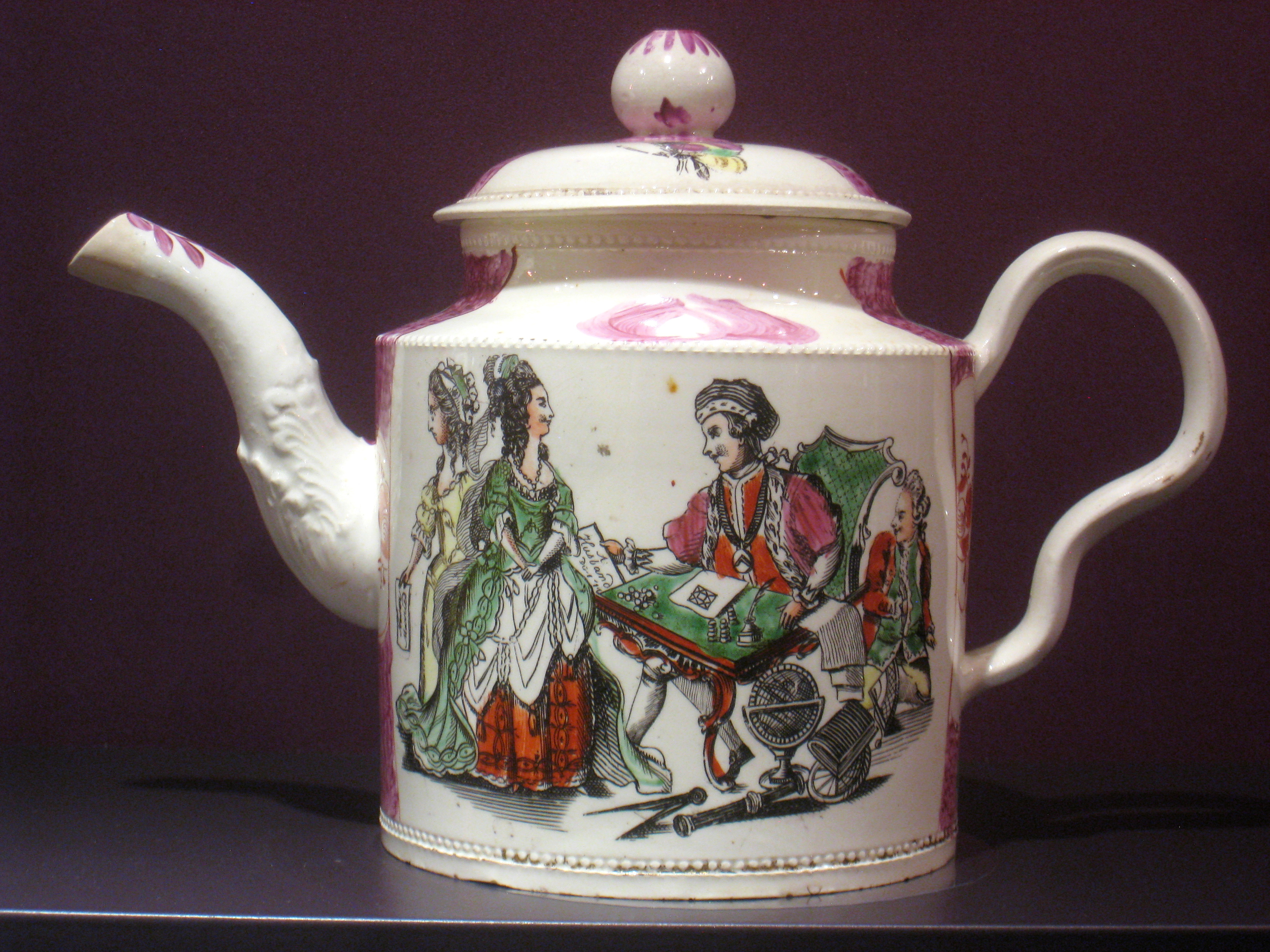
A typical William Greatbatch teapot, depicting 'The Fortune Teller'. Creamware with overglaze printed and painted decoration. c. 1778–1782.

== Personal life and antecedents ==
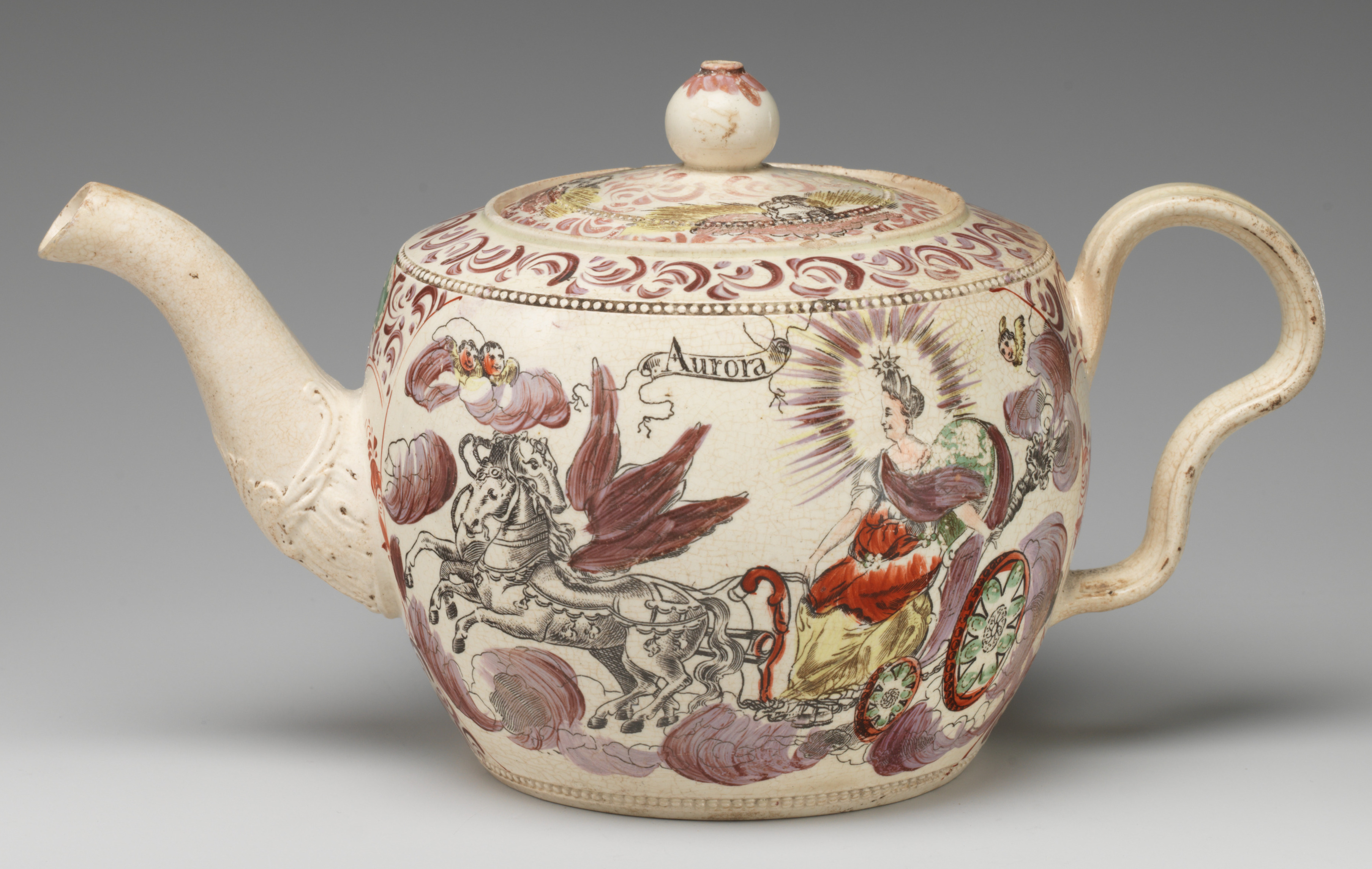
Aurora teapot, 1760s, hand-painted overglaze enamels over transfer-printed black.

The exact date and place of William Greatbatch's birth have not been established. It is thought that he was born around 1735 and the surname Greatbatch suggests a local Staffordshire origin for the family.

Writing in 1829, Simeon Shaw stated that Greatbatch's father was a farmer at Berryhill who supplied coals to the pottery manufacturers of the area, including Thomas Whieldon, but modern scholars have considered this to be unsupported by evidence.

On 26 March 1759 Greatbatch married Sarah Simpkin and they had three sons, Hugh, William and Richard. The two eldest sons went on the work in the pottery business.

== Career as a potter ==
William Greatbatch was apprenticed to Thomas Whieldon at Fenton Vivian, possibly in 1753. Whieldon was one of the most prolific and influential potters of the day and Greatbatch's apprenticeship would have offered many opportunities. Greatbatch was a highly skilled and innovative modeller and followed in the footsteps of Aaron Wood, one of the greatest Staffordshire modellers who had left Whieldon's employment a few years previously. Greatbatch first met Josiah Wedgwood when apprenticed to Whieldon, during a time when Whieldon and Wedgwood were in business partnership (1754 to 1759).

William Greatbatch left Whieldon's employment sometime before 1762 and possibly as early as 1760.

He was confident enough in his mid-twenties to set up an independent business at Lower Lane, Fenton. Here, he enjoyed a business arrangement with Josiah Wedgwood from at least 1762, supplying Wedgwood with a wide range of pottery wares as well as block moulds. William Greatbatch was a skilled modeller, designer and maker of block moulds for the more elaborate types of ware which needed to be press-moulded or slip-cast.

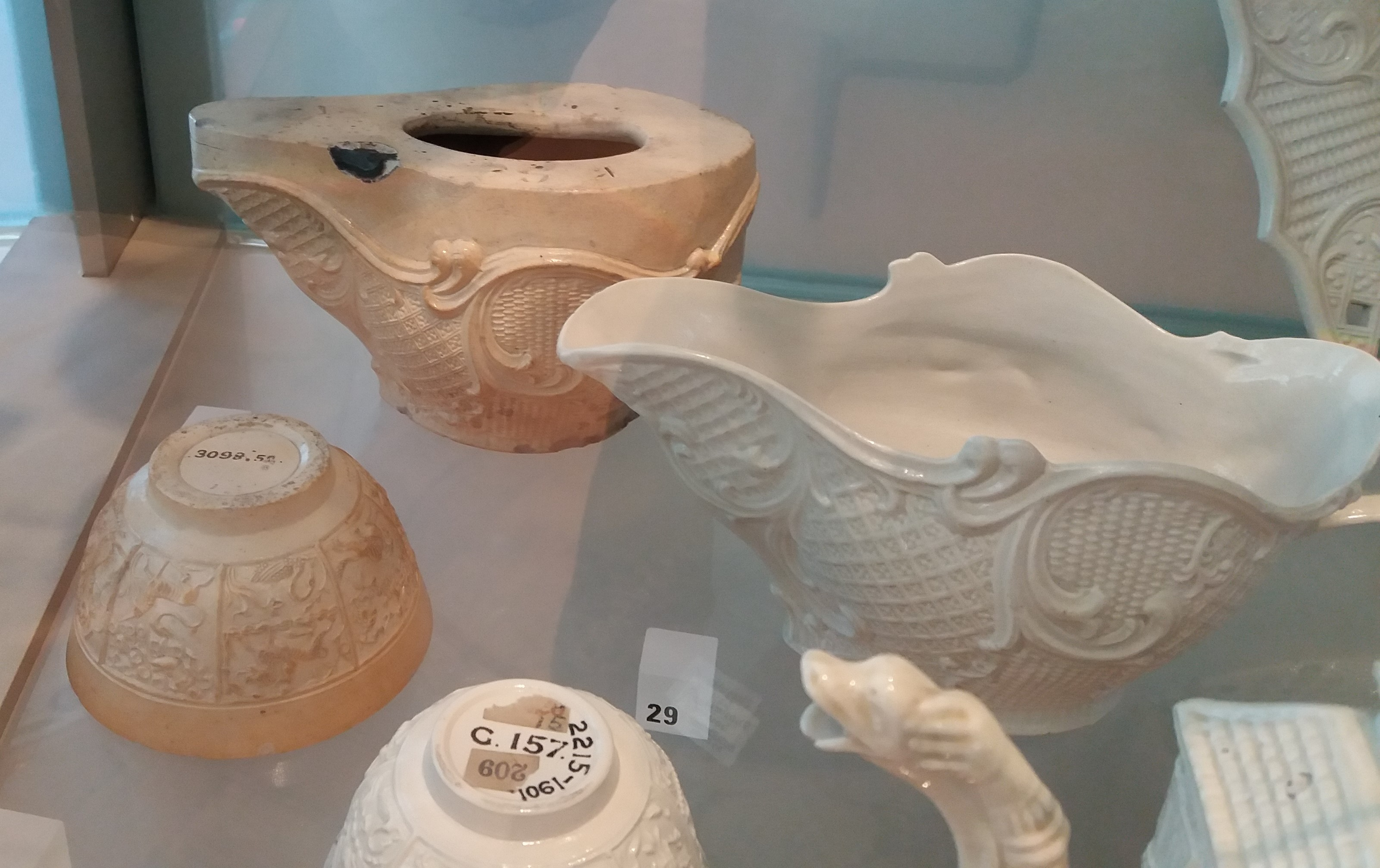
(Rear left): Block mould for a sauceboat by Aaron Wood, 1757–65. In front is a finished vessel from a similar mould. Victoria & Albert Museum, London, Room 138.

As well as working for Wedgwood, Greatbatch also designed, manufactured and sold wares in his own right for the following twenty years.

== Bankruptcy ==
The London Gazette dated 12 to 16 February 1782 carried a notice of William Greatbatch's bankruptcy, the reasons for which are not known. It is unclear what happened immediately following his vacation of the Lower Lane site by 1783, however, by 1786 he is recorded as being in the direct employment of Josiah Wedgwood at the Etruria works, holding an unspecified senior position. It is possible he was taken on as general manager when Wedgwood's cousin Thomas Wedgwood left around the same time (1788) intending to establish his own works (though Thomas died shortly afterwards). On his bankruptcy the pottery works were taken over by the landlord, William Baker of Fenton House, who established his own pottery on the site.

== Retirement and death ==
Greatbatch continued in this position until his retirement around the year 1807, aged about 72, when his work notes cease. He enjoyed an unusually generous pension thereafter, on the instructions of Wedgwood who had pre-deceased him in 1795, as well as the rent-free use of a substantial house owned by Wedgwood, in recognition of his high regard.

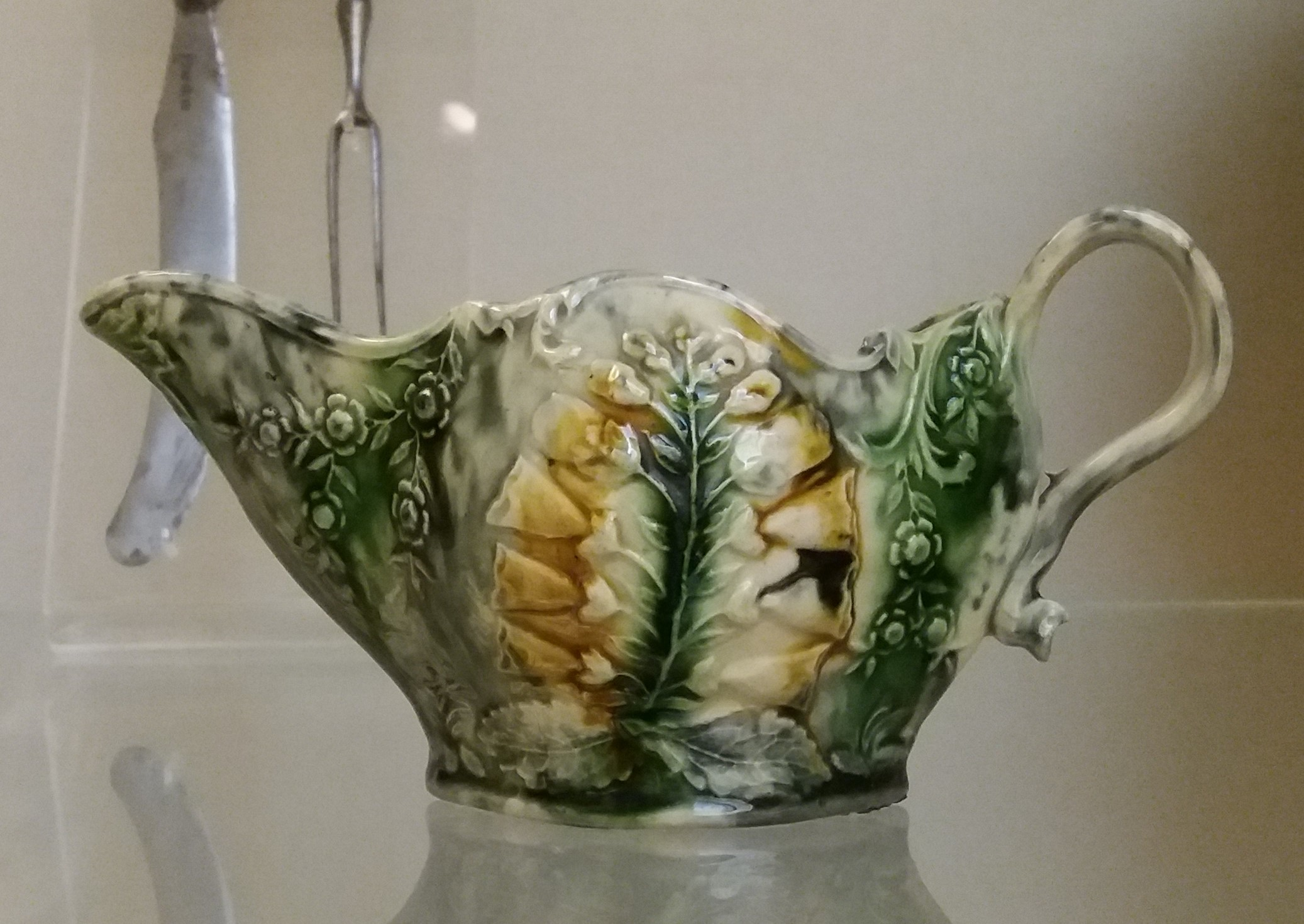
Josiah Wedgwood: Sauceboat c. 1760. Cream-coloured earthenware, moulded & glazed. The model by William Greatbatch was supplied to Wedgwood. British Museum MLA Pottery Cat. H4

The exact date of death was not recorded but burial records show he was interred on 29 April 1813 in the churchyard of St. Peter ad Vincula in the parish of Stoke upon Trent.

== The wares ==
Greatbatch is best known as a producer of creamware, and finished wares were either finished with transparent glaze or were hand painted or, after 1770, had transfer-printed decoration applied under the glaze.

Creamwares included the tortoiseshell wares, and a variety of moulded and colour-glazed wares such as the cauliflower wares.

Pearlware was also produced from around 1775. This is closely related to creamware (but not used synonymously by experts). Pearlware uses a china glaze which is a lead glaze with a blue tint resulting from the addition of a minute quantity of cobalt to the recipe. Often the same designs were used in production of both creamware and pearlware.

Wares could also be decoratively turned by lathe, or rouletted for effect; sponged or painted with colour either under-glaze or over-glaze or slip decorated (at this period this would mean marbled). Applied relief decoration was also common at least until around 1770.

Greatbatch produced a wide range of domestic wares, including teapots, coffee pots, cups and saucers, bowls, dishes and plates amongst others. The invoices for supply of wares to Wedgwood suggest there were probably at least 60 different models in production at any one time, though the type of ware (e.g., creamware or red stoneware) is not specified on these lists.

Greatbatch was an expert modeller and maker of block moulds for the production of wares and often produced these for Wedgwood and others.

Certain types of pottery were popular and produced by many manufacturers of the time, and were commonly traded amongst each other for business reasons, so it is not always possible to say which manufacturer made any particular piece. Minute examination of form in remaining sherds found on site – whether handles, spouts or decorations – have allowed some unique Greatbatch features to be recorded (see Typology (Archaeology)).

Of all the types produced, the moulded creamware Fruit Basket Ware type has now been shown to be uniquely the work of Greatbatch. This fine type included tea and coffee wares, canisters, cups, jugs and plates, each with a distinctive design of a band of woven basketwork, above which is a trellis band with fruit of various sorts piled into the basket.

== Tortoiseshell wares and Thomas Whieldon ==
Tortoiseshell wares are those that have been decorated by the application of coloured metallic oxides prepared as slips and applied to the biscuit body of a pot either by sponge or by brush. These were then covered by a transparent lead-glaze and fired a second time (known as glaze or glost firing).

Historically, tortoiseshell wares have come to be associated almost exclusively with Thomas Whieldon, however, in his 1991 study, Staffordshire ceramics expert David Barker states:

"Many of the wares manufactured by Whieldon are of types now known to have been made by Greatbatch and have been found on the Greatbatch site. Whieldon ware, or Whieldon-type ware are terms which are widely accepted in describing a variety of ceramics, particularly tortoiseshell wares, but which lead to problems in any objective research into the pottery of the period."

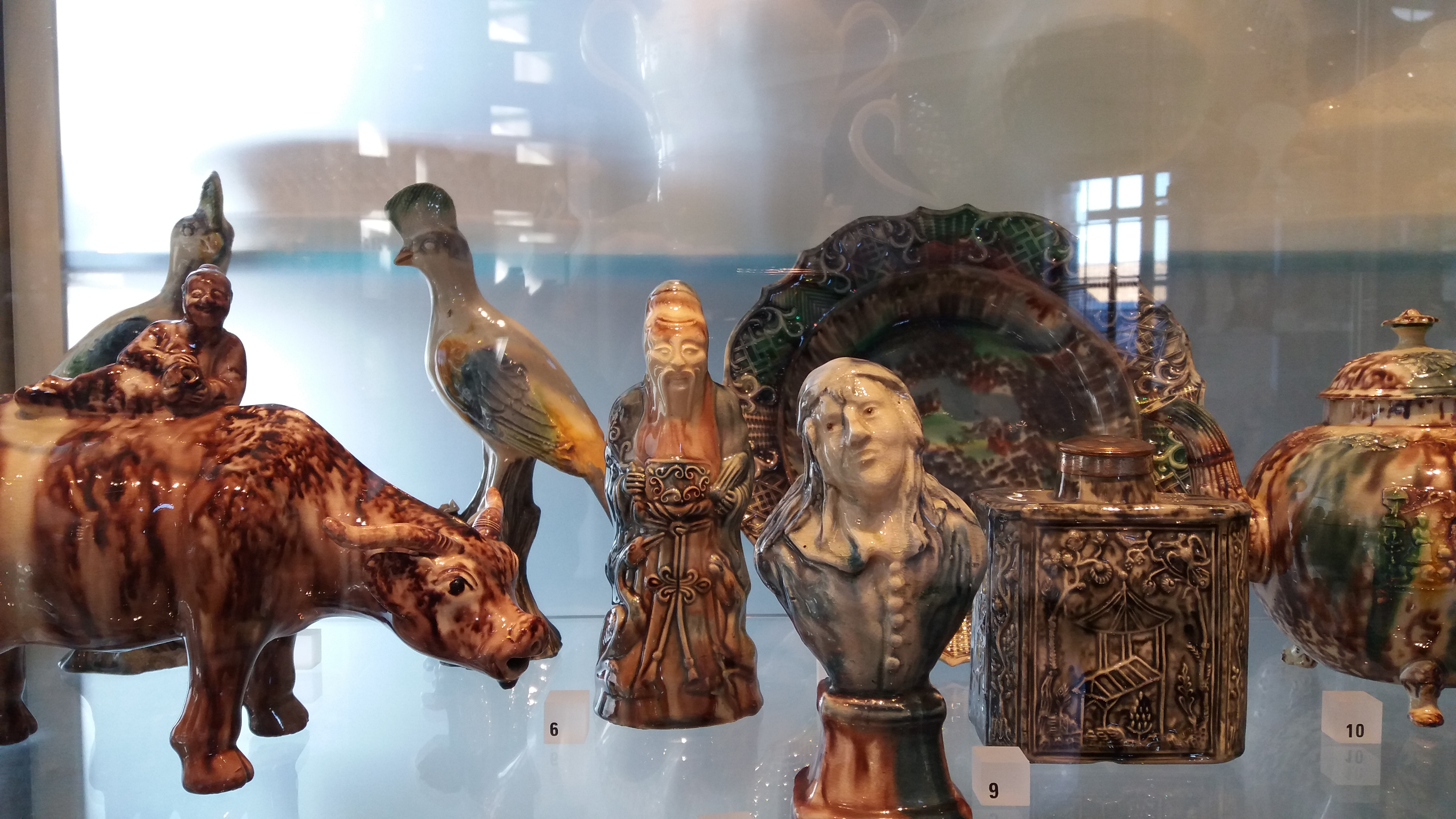
Examples of mid-18th century Staffordshire earthenware with glazes stained by underglaze pigments. Victoria & Albert Museum, London, Room 138

The Fenton site, described below, contained many examples of tortoiseshell wares from the Greatbatch factory from throughout the 1770s.

== Archaeology ==
The discovery, early in 1978, of a quantity of 18th century factory waste material in Fenton, Stoke-on-Trent, unexpectedly brought the name of William Greatbatch to the attention of ceramics students. The significance was first recognised by ceramics expert Donald Towner and the site was then excavated by David Barker on behalf of the City Museum & Art Gallery, Stoke-on-Trent. An exceptionally large waste tip was uncovered containing layers of pottery showing the various types of wares produced by the Greatbatch works over a period of twenty years from 1762 to 1782.

The site of Greatbatch's factory was some 100 metres away. This was close to the works owned by Thomas Whieldon with whom Greatbatch served his apprenticeship, at Fenton Vivian. Thanks to these excavations, Greatbatch's products have become the best documented of all the wares of the period.

== The work of William Greatbatch in major museums ==
William Greatbatch's pots can be found in the following major collections in the UK:

Victoria and Albert Museum, London, England. A list of Greatbatch's work may be found here:

British Museum, London, England

City Museum & Art Gallery, Stoke-on-Trent, England

In collections in the USA:

The Mint Museum, Charlotte, NC, USA A list of Greatbatch's work may be found here: The Mint Museum has a noted collection of 18th century British pottery and porcelain.
