= Thomas Whieldon =

English potter (1719–1795)

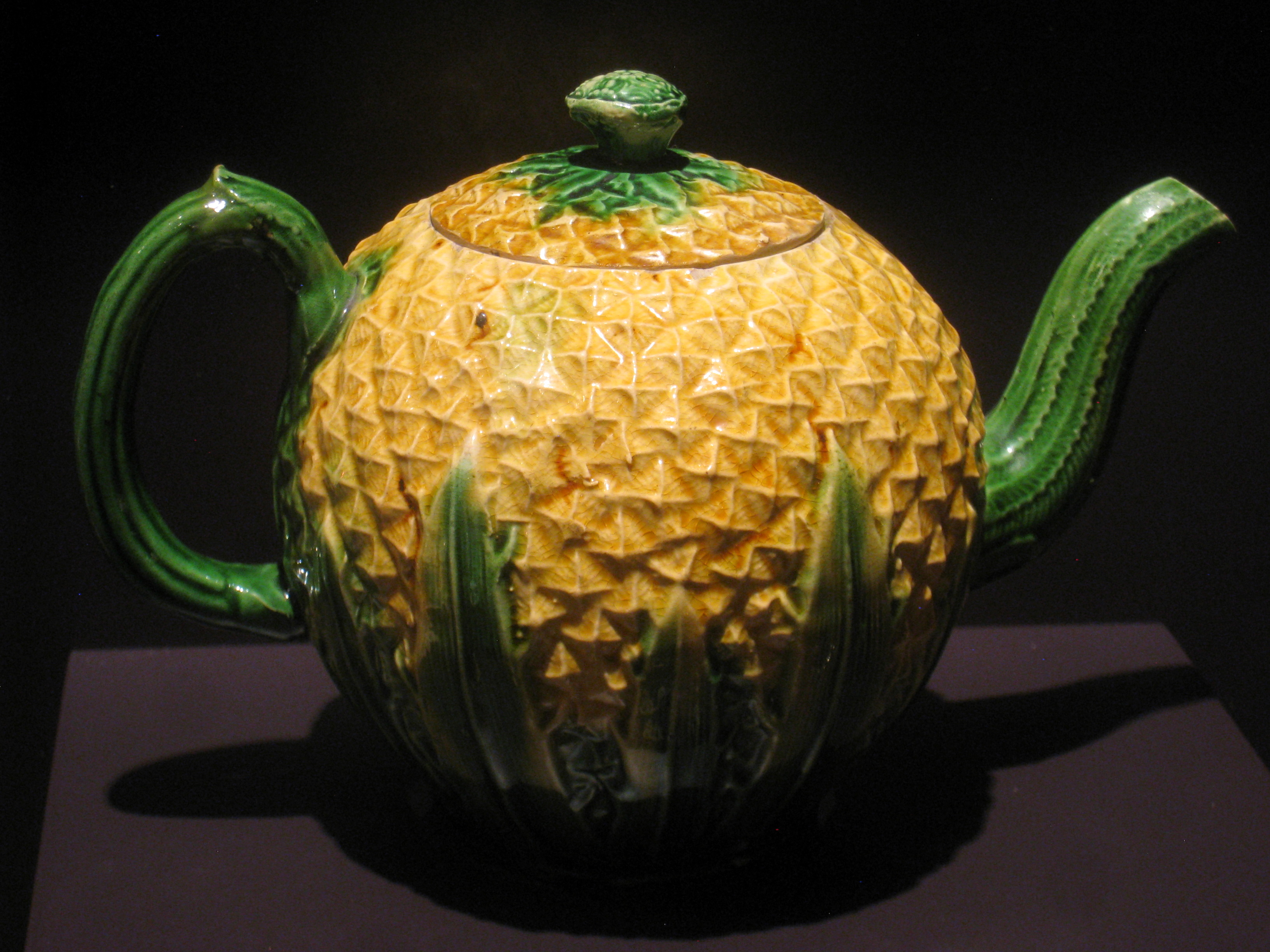
Teapot by Thomas Whieldon and Josiah Wedgwood, 1760–1765.

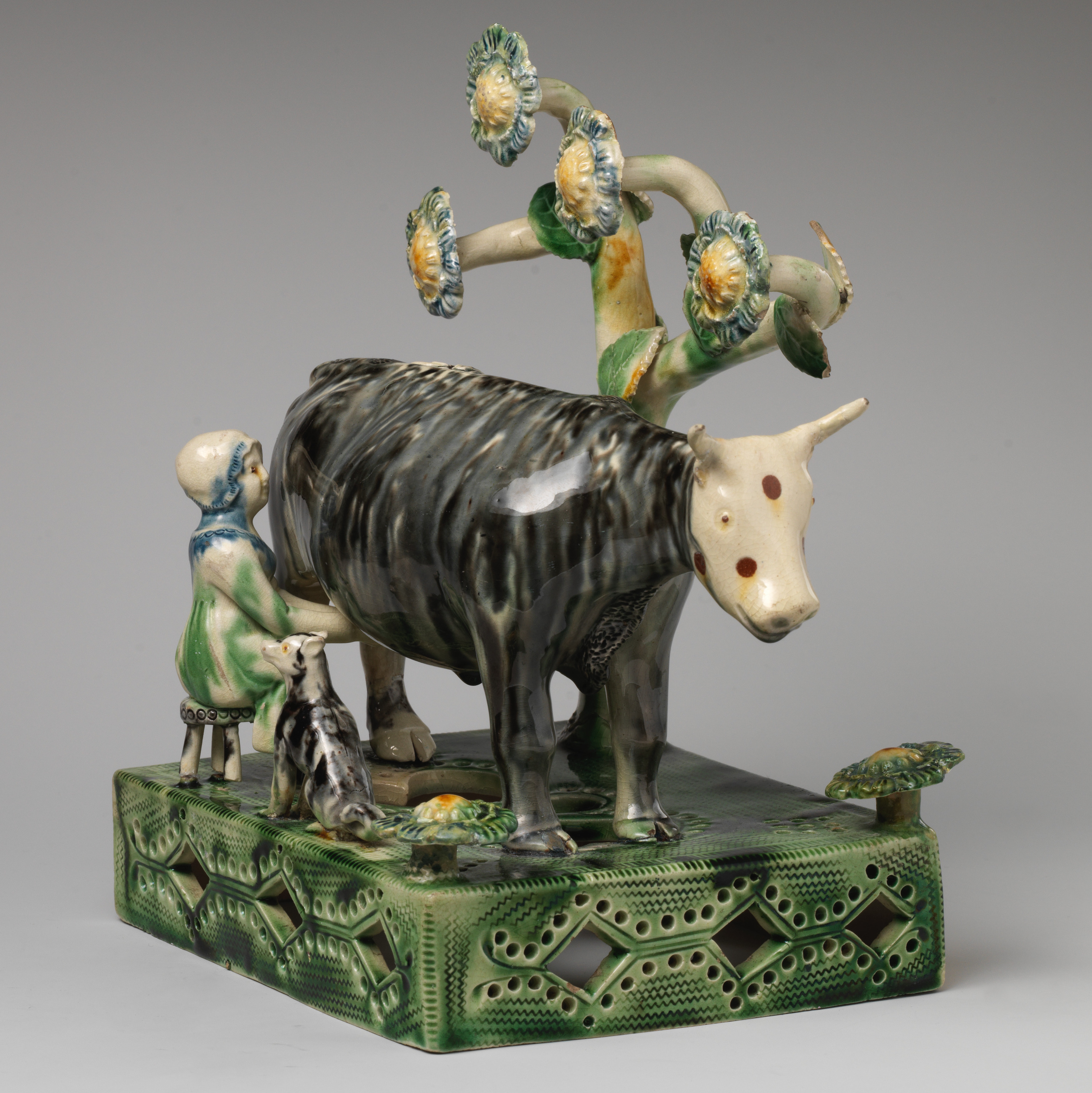
"Whieldon-type" Staffordshire figure; this is a large group of wares of unclear origin.

Thomas Whieldon (September 1719 in Penkhull, Staffordshire – March 1795) was an English potter who played a leading role in the development of Staffordshire pottery.

The attribution of actual pieces to his factory has long been uncertain, and terms such as "Whieldon-type" are now often used for a variety of different types of wares. Other terms reflecting the lack of certainty are "Whieldon ware" as a type, and "Astbury-Whieldon", used for early Staffordshire figures, where the two were pioneers. He worked in earthenware and stoneware, using a variety of types of body and ceramic glazes. He is especially associated with agate ware and tortoiseshell ware; in both cases Whieldon refined the techniques used, and made the types more popular.

== Personal life ==
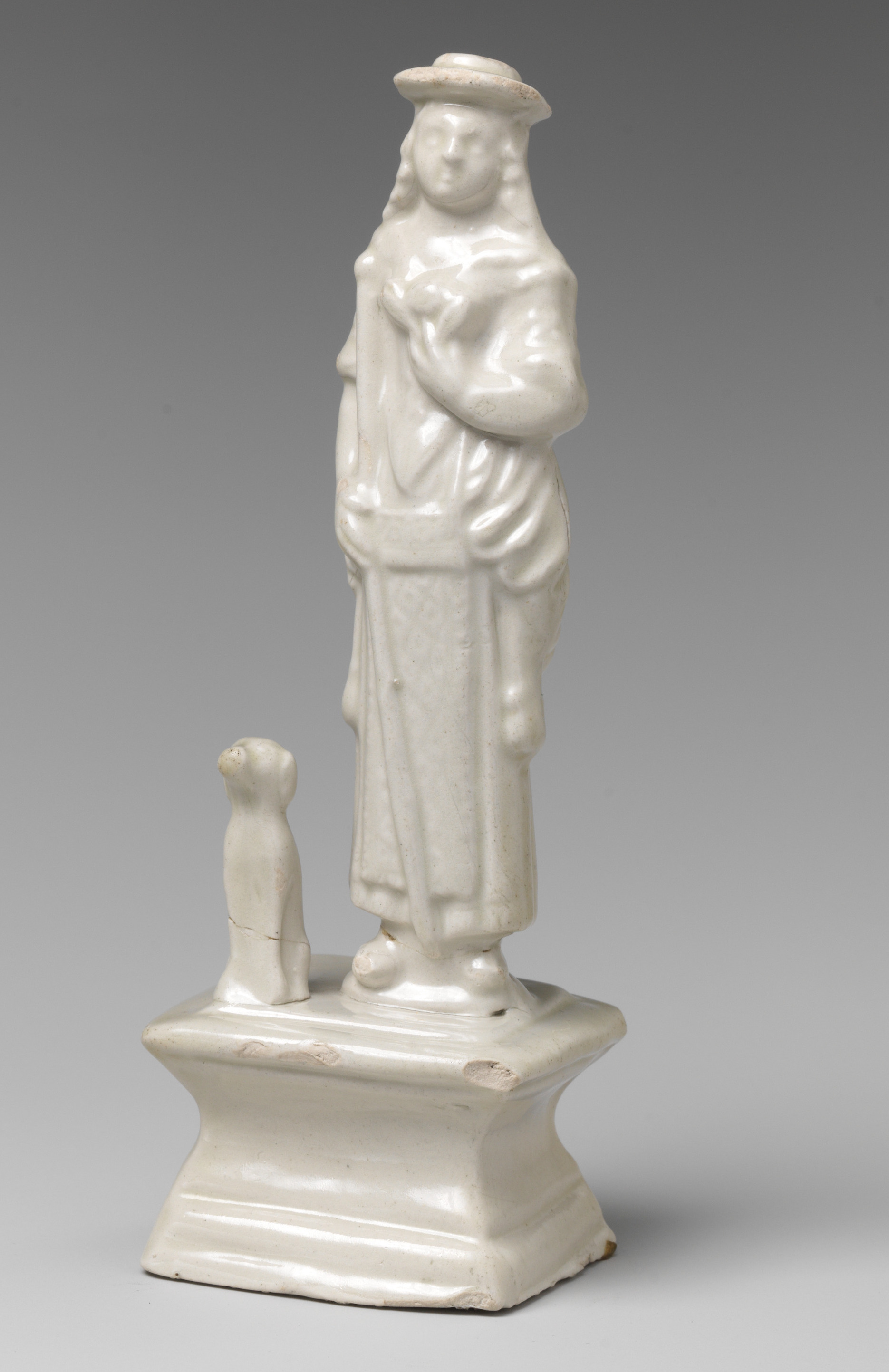
Very early Staffordshire figure of Oriental lady and dog in salt-glazed earthenware, c. 1745, Whieldon factory. Also made in tortoiseshell ware, image.

Whieldon is first recorded as a potter in 1744 when he married Anne Shaw at Barlaston Church. Little is known about his early career and it is not known where he served his apprenticeship. Anne died in 1757 and in 1758 Whieldon married Alice Parrot, the daughter of a notable family from Newcastle-under-Lyme. Josiah Wedgwood recorded how Alice later died very suddenly at church one Sunday night in 1772. Whieldon married a third time in 1776, marrying Sarah Turner, who was from London society, although there was a family connection, as yet unknown, with one John Turner of Lane End, Staffordshire, a potter. James Christie, founder of the auctioneering house of Pall Mall, St James's, was a signatory to the marriage settlement.

There were six children from the marriage to Sarah Turner including one daughter and five sons.

Whieldon's Account Book provides much information for his business during the period 1749 to 1762 and from 1754 to 1759 when he was in partnership with Josiah Wedgwood, but beyond that there is little documentary evidence of his family or his life save for the normal run of parish records and occasional mentions in the private correspondence of Josiah Wedgwood and others.

Thomas Whieldon became very wealthy as a result of his business acumen but preferred to live next door to his Fenton Vivian factory, at Whieldon Grove, a fine house from which he was able to see his works. He continued to live there after his retirement in 1780, when he demolished his factory and planted an ornamental garden on the site, as none of his children wished to take on the business. In 1786 he was appointed High Sheriff of Staffordshire, underlining his social position, and in 1789 he was granted a coat of arms.

He died in 1795, outliving his former partner Josiah Wedgwood by just a few weeks, and was buried in the parish church of Stoke-upon-Trent.

== Whieldon the potter ==
At some time between 1742 and 1747 Whieldon became a tenant at Fenton Vivian and in 1748 he bought the freehold. He was to remain at this site throughout his career. By 1750 he had bought an additional pottery factory at Fenton Low but this was let to tenants and there is no evidence he ever used the factory at Fenton Low himself. Archaeological finds of sherds at Fenton Low cannot be taken as evidence of Whieldon's early production therefore.

Whieldon's high reputation enabled him to attract into his employment some of the most important figures in the early history of Staffordshire pottery. These included Aaron Wood, the most prominent ceramic block-cutter or modeller of the day; Josiah Spode, who went on to found his own renowned ceramics factory and William Greatbatch, another prominent figure. From 1754 to 1759 Whieldon enjoyed a partnership with the young Josiah Wedgwood.

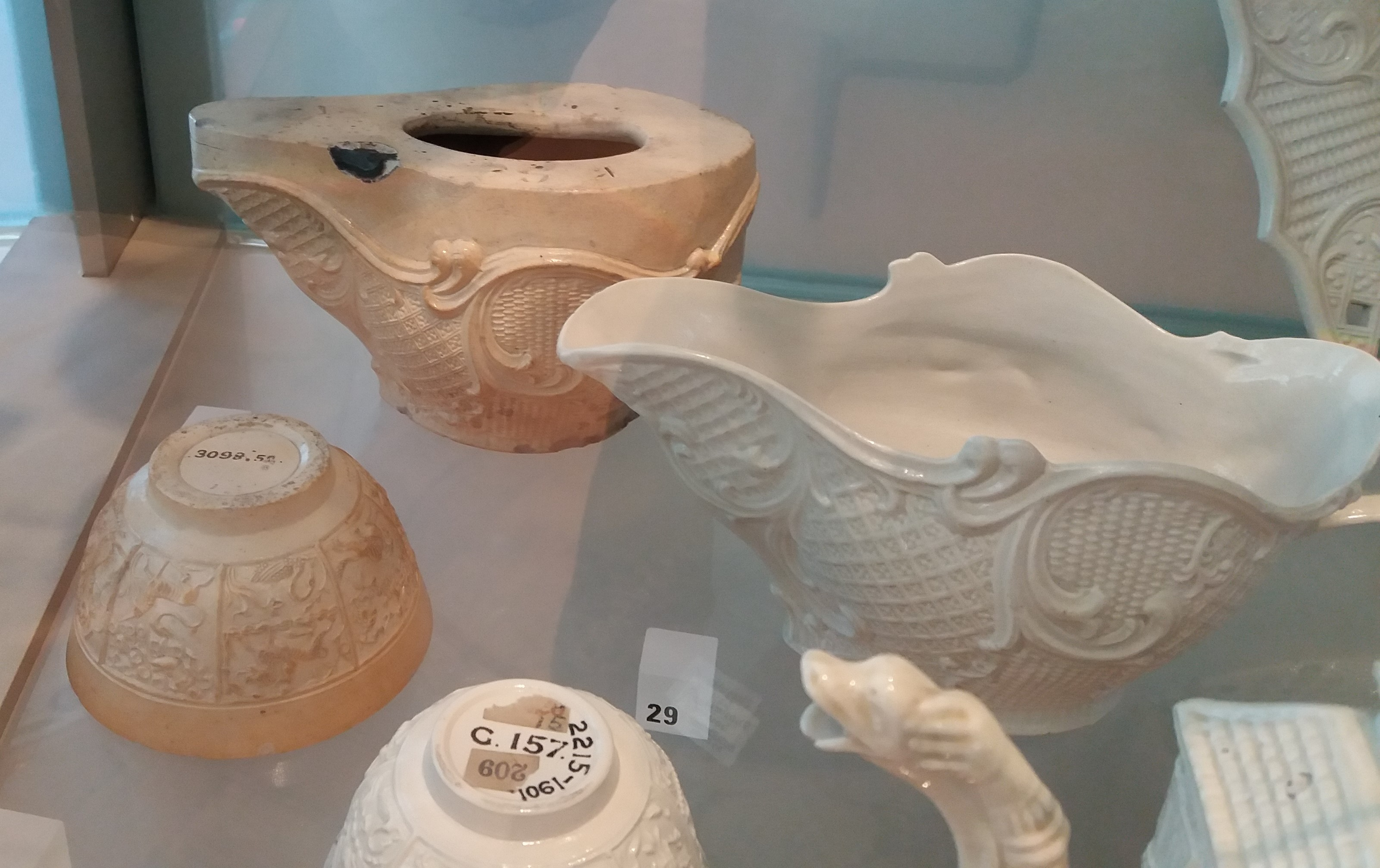
A block mould by Aaron Wood, 1757–65 (the mould is shown rear left, with a similar finished sauceboat in the foreground). Aaron Wood, who formerly worked for Thomas Whieldon, was one of the leading block-makers of the time. On display at the V&A Museum, London, Room 138.

Thomas Whieldon was recognised by his contemporaries as one of the most successful potters in Britain and one author has suggested that, aside from Wedgwood's family members who were already established in business, "there was probably no one who could have taught him so much about the innovative techniques that were already changing an ancient craft into a substantial industry."

Other writers have pointed to a possible lack of innovation, on the contrary: according to Brian Dolan, Whieldon's production appears to have altered little between 1759, when Wedgwood left him, and 1780 when he retired.

Robin Hildyard has said, less generously, that Whieldon lacked creative ambition and "was content to mass-produce unadventurous wares for general consumption", providing Wedgwood only with "an object-lesson in how to acquire wealth with a minimum of risk."

== Wedgwood and Whieldon: the partnership 1754–1759 ==
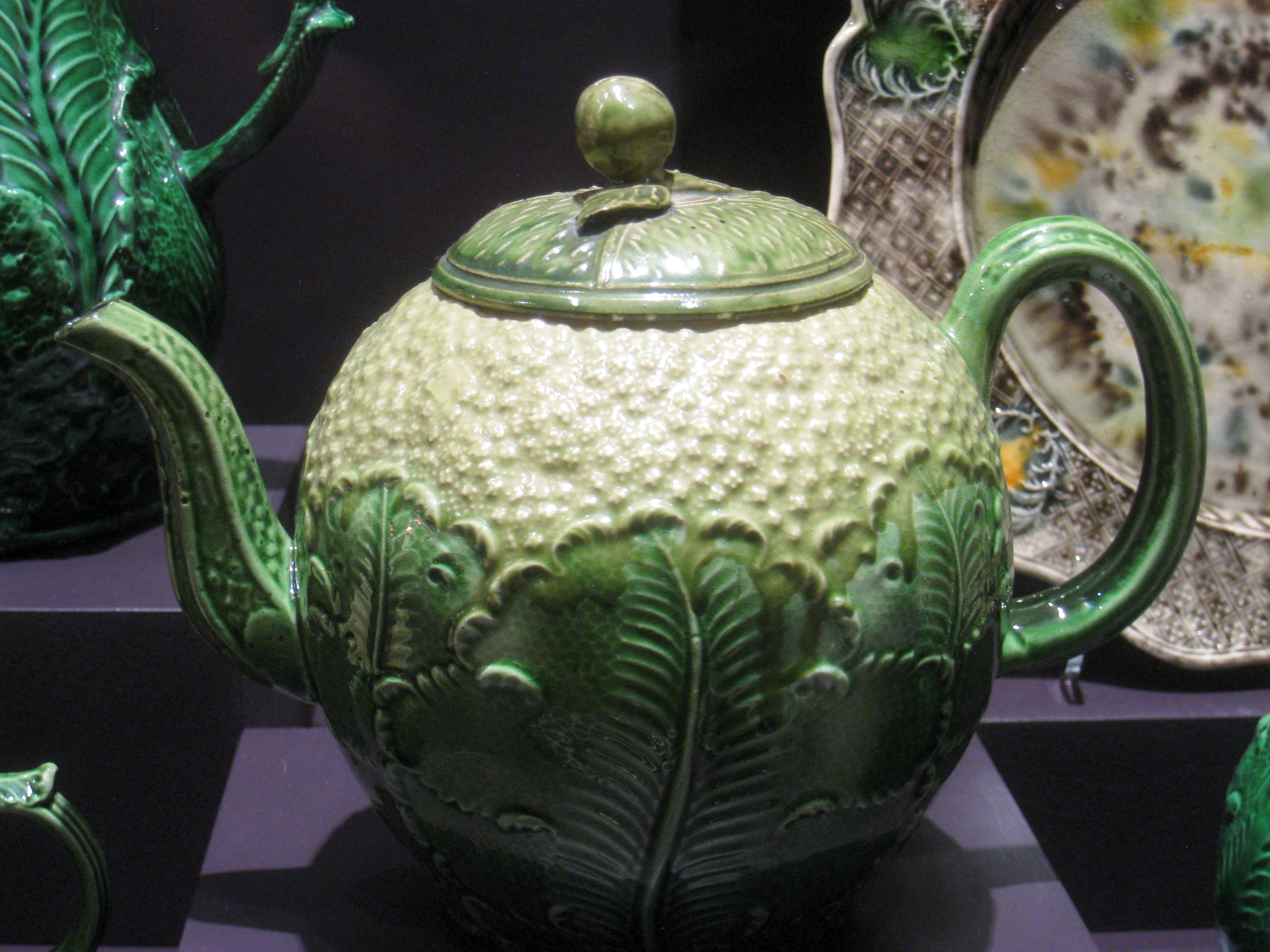
Wedgwood and Whieldon cauliflower teapot

Thomas Whieldon took Josiah Wedgwood into partnership at his factory at Fenton Vivian in 1754. By then Whieldon was 35 years old and had already achieved financial success and a considerable reputation whilst Wedgwood was just 24 years old; Whieldon had clearly recognised his great potential.

Whieldon's pottery production is described by Josiah Wedgwood in his contemporary Experiment Book where there is a wealth of manuscript material on the partnership. Here Wedgwood explains that by 1759 there was an urgent need to improve the quality of lead-glazed creamware which was the principle ware being produced by Whieldon at the time. Prices for this type of ware were rapidly declining and the quality of production was suffering as a result.

It is likely that Wedgwood's work with Whieldon was largely experimental and concerned with improving the factory's wares and looking to the future. This set Wedgwood on a course of experimentation that lead on to his future fame.

"These considerations induced me to try for some more solid improvement, as well in the Body, as the Glazes, the Colours, & the Forms, of the articles of our manufacture."

Wedgwood was brought into partnership to address these problems and was mainly engaged in improving the lead glazes for creamware. Creamware at that time had already achieved an acceptable white body but no one had succeeded in producing a transparent lead glaze. By 1759, when Wedgwood decided to leave and set up his own independent business, he had already made his first successful experimental glazes.

Even after Wedgwood had established his own business, he continued to buy-in wares from Whieldon, usually biscuitware for later decoration and glazing, to meet demand, when needed. He also frequently bought wares from William Greatbatch, whom he knew from his time with Whieldon.

== The wares ==
Archaeological excavations at the Fenton Vivian site conducted by Arnold Mountford on behalf of Stoke City Museum between 1968 and 1970 found evidence of salt-glazed stoneware, tortoiseshell ware, agateware, red stoneware, glazed red earthenware, blackware and a small amount of plain creamware, all dating from the time of Whieldon's partnership with Wedgwood. There were also a few fragments of painted creamware, depicting Chinese-inspired figures and flowers, of a type rarely associated with Whieldon.

Whieldon kept an Account and Memorandum Book and his records for 1749–53 show a wide range of pottery goods produced, including coffeepots, teapots, punch pots, bowls, ewers, sugar dishes, plates, tureens and ‘toys’ or trinkets. There is evidence of a range of figures being produced but not in great quantities. Forms were sometimes based on contemporary silver and pewter shapes, and were both press-moulded and slipcast.

None of Whieldon's pottery was marked, making attribution difficult. The shards excavated at the Fenton Vivian site are a vital source of information allowing some attribution by typology. It was common practice for factories in the 18th century to share or copy designs, or to buy and sell ceramic block-moulds, so care has to be taken in ascribing particular pots to particular factories in the absence of any other supporting evidence. Finishes such as spouts, handles and knops can provide vital clues.

== Tortoiseshell ware ==
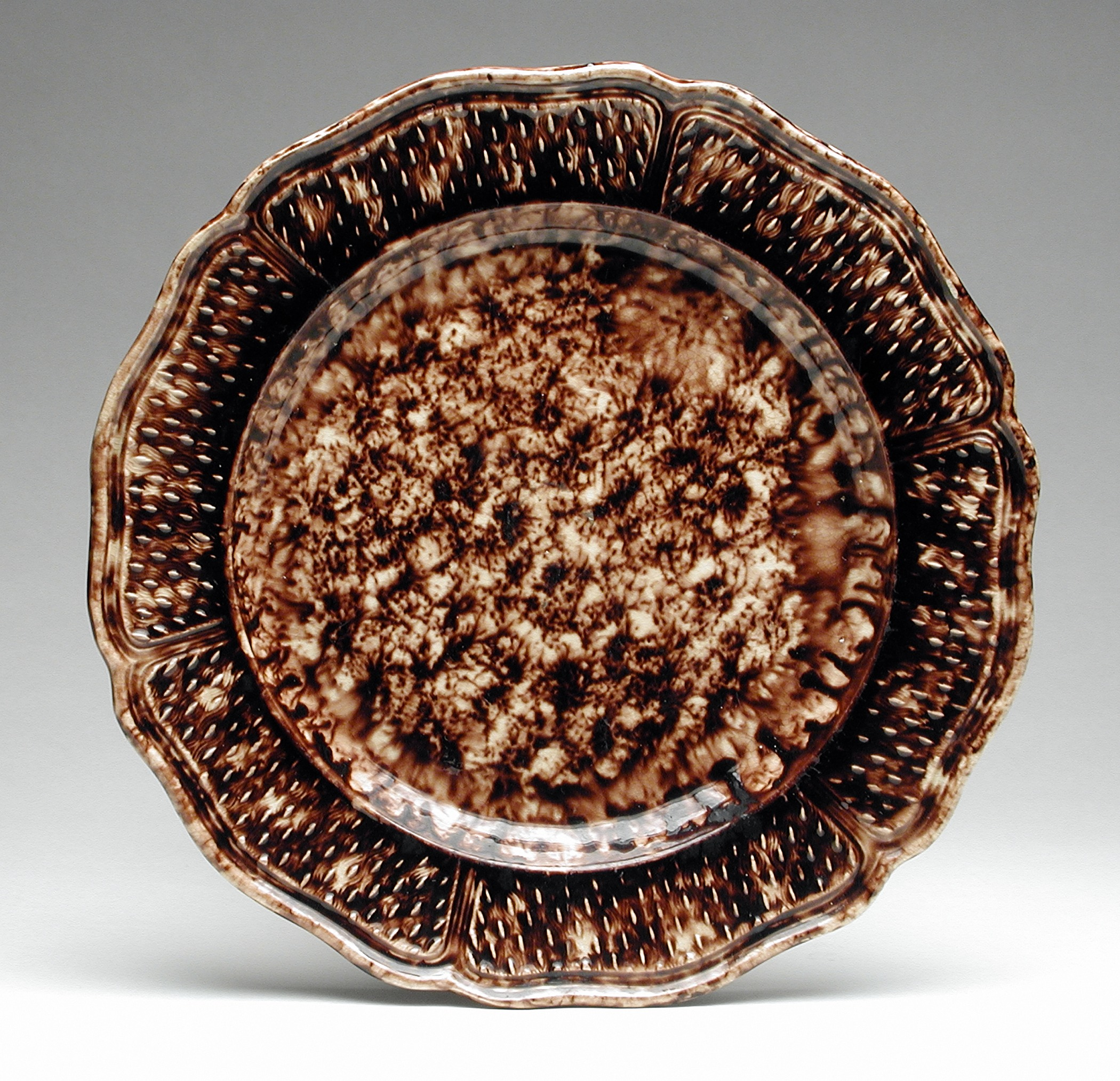
Tortoiseshell Ware plate attrributed to the Whieldon factory, c. 1765

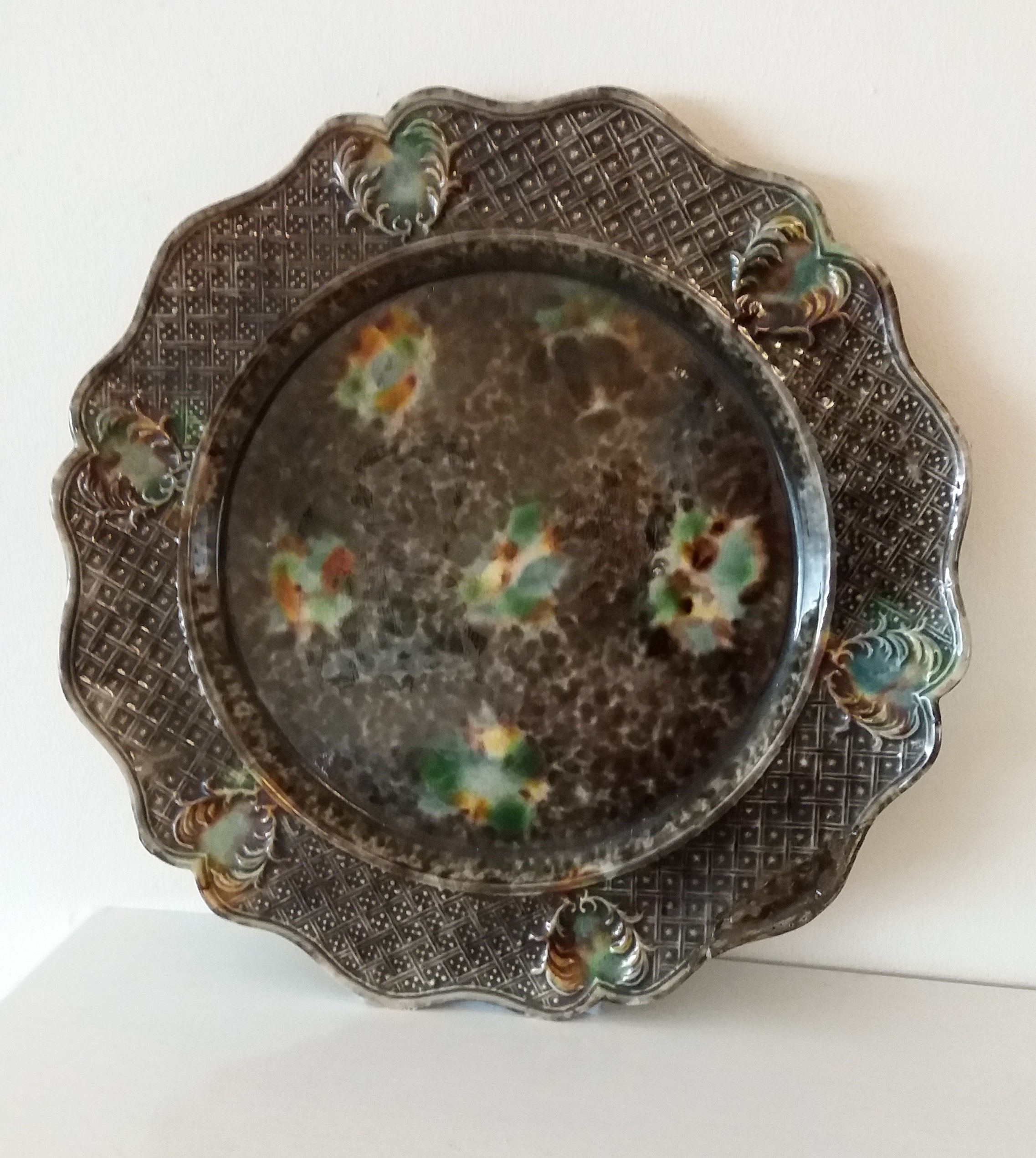
Thomas Whieldon: A tortoiseshell-ware plate, possibly by the Thomas Whieldon factory, c. 1760. A similar pattern was known to be used by William Greatbatch for production of transfer-printed creamware in the 1770s (see below). Private Collection.

Tortoiseshell ware is an earthenware, often creamware, that is decorated with a limited, rather dark, palette to imitate tortoiseshell, as fashionable material in the period. It was made before Whieldon, by William Greatbatch and many others in Staffordshire and also Liverpool and Leeds. The original technique was to sprinkle the unfired (or green) wares with "powdered lead oxide and calcined flint with a trace of manganese oxide". This produced the colour effect within the glaze.

Whieldon's innovation, about 1750, was his "first important contribution to the pottery trade". The pigments were applied under the glaze by painting or sponging with metallic oxides, and then a transparent glaze was applied. During the glost firing, the colours flow to produce the tortoiseshell effect.

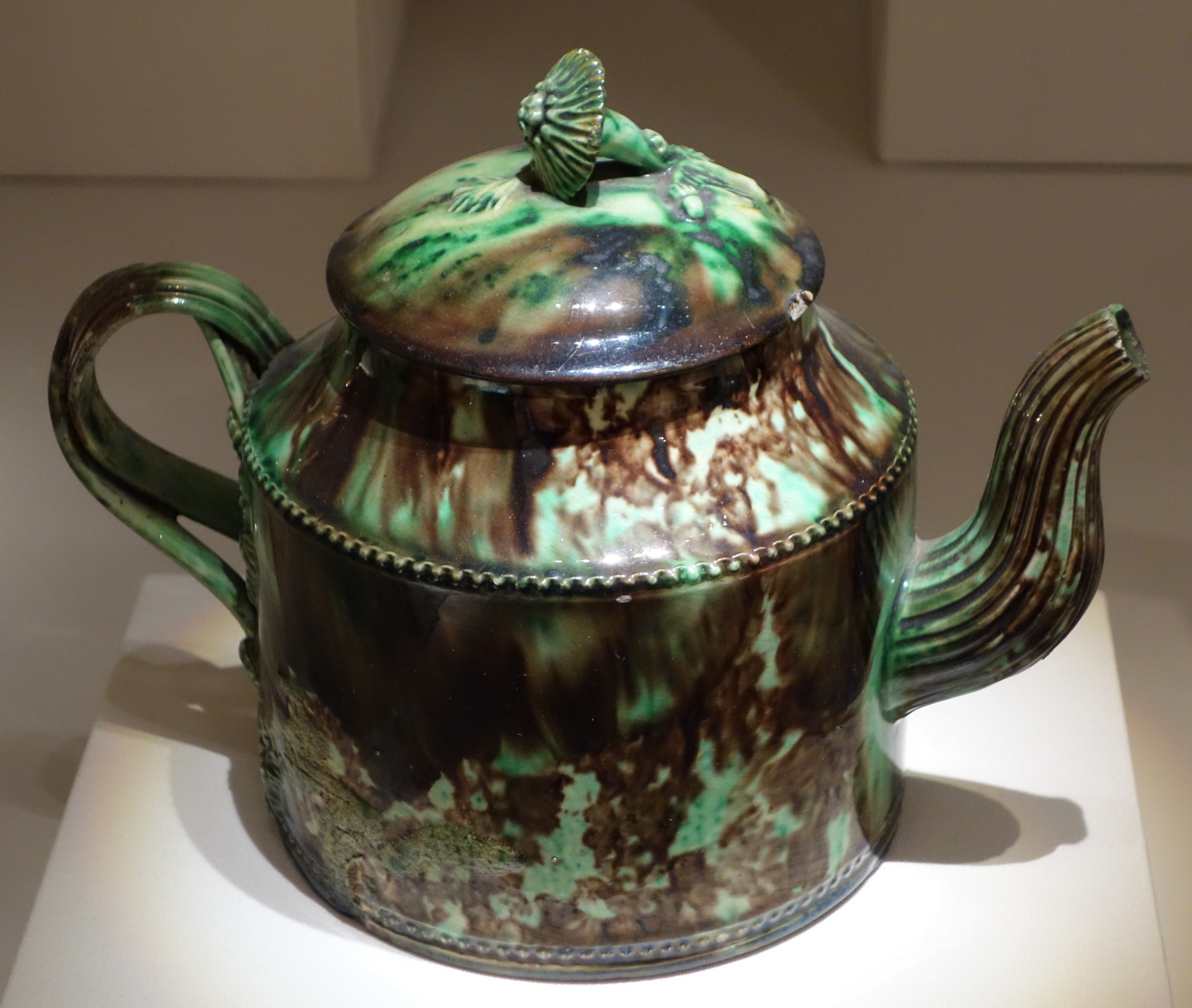
Teapot, c. 1755

Tortoiseshell wares were first mentioned by Thomas Whieldon in his Account and Memorandum Book of 1749. In his Experiment Book, Josiah Wedgwood states that in 1759 tortoiseshell ware was the second most important ware at the Whieldon factory, but the market was declining:

“[…] But as no improvement had been made in this branch for several years, the country was grown weary of it; and though the price had been lowered from time to time, in order to increase the sale, the expedient did not answer, and something new was wanted, to give a little spirit to the business."

Historically, tortoiseshell wares have come to be associated almost exclusively with Thomas Whieldon, however, Pat Halfpenny warned that:

“The ‘Whieldon’ label has inhibited scholarly research and limited our understanding of the pottery production dates in North Staffordshire.”

In his 1991 study of William Greatbatch, David Barker also concluded:

"Many of the wares manufactured by Whieldon are of types now known to have been made by Greatbatch and have been found on the Greatbatch site. Whieldon ware, or Whieldon-type ware are terms which are widely accepted in describing a variety of ceramics, particularly tortoiseshell wares, but which lead to problems in any objective research into the pottery of the period."

In the absence of any supporting information, caution is therefore needed in ascribing any particular tortoiseshell wares to Thomas Whieldon.

== Workforce ==
In the 18th century it was common for whole families, including children, to be working in pottery manufacture. Workers were engaged, for example, as specialist potters, painters or ‘oven’ (or kiln) men. Whieldon had an exceptionally large workforce for the period and expected ‘scrupulous obedience, respectful behaviour and strict punctuality’. Workers were organised into teams and well paid, with skilled workers’ pay being linked to productivity.

Whieldon was remarkable for being the first employer in the potteries to offer rented accommodation for his workers, which he did as early as 1750 with eight houses. Later, Josiah Wedgwood took up the idea of a community for his workforce at the Etruria works when he founded the village of Etruria in 1769, consisting of 42 dwellings and an inn.

A Turnpike Petition dated 1763 revealed that at that time there were 150 separate pottery businesses operating in the Staffordshire Potteries employing as many as 7,000 people.

Potters working with lead glazes were exposed to lead poisoning and the dangers of serious health problems.

== Transportation ==
As the markets for Staffordshire pottery grew during the 18th century, the need for improved transportation links became more pressing. In the early part of the 18th century, goods were generally sold locally and transported by 'crate-men' who carried goods in large panniers on their backs. Mules were sometimes used instead. Local roads were so poor that mules and men were likely to stumble with their heavy loads into potholes. Some of these potholes were two feet deep or more and were hazardous to life.

Originally, all the main routes by which goods might leave the Potteries involved a combination of road and river transport out to the ports and the coastal trade routes. Road journeys by these routes varied between 20 and 40 miles in length and progress was slow. Because roads were in a poor state before the introduction of turnpikes, many of the finished goods were broken in transit, substantially reducing the profitability of pottery production.

By the 1750s there was a strong London market for goods and some trade with Europe. Whieldon, Spode and Wedgwood were amongst those who subscribed to the first turnpike roads in the neighbourhood. Josiah Wedgwood went on to revolutionise transportation within the Potteries by commissioning the first canals from 1766.

== Forgery ==
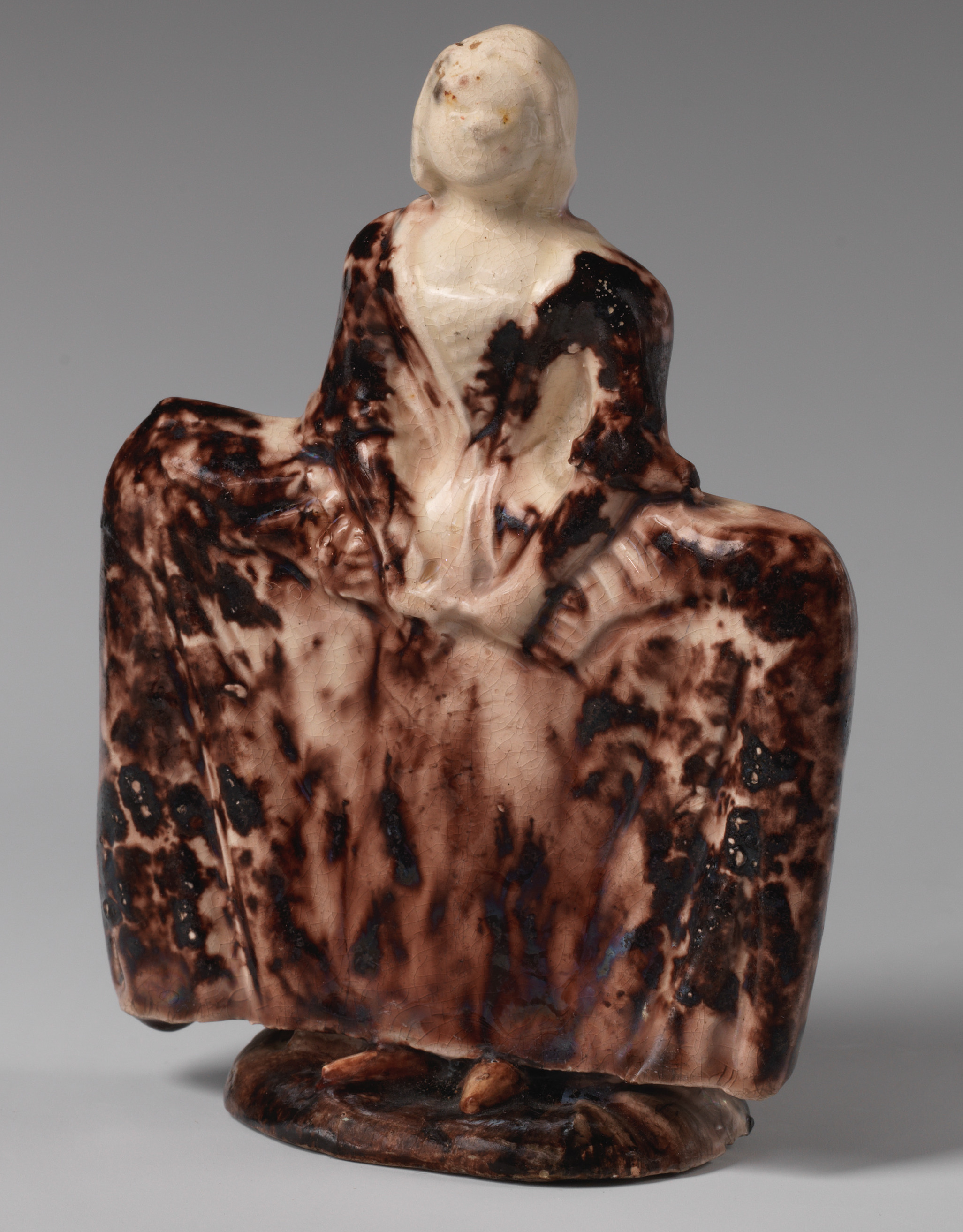
Figure, c. 1750, of lady with pannier dress.

Because of the popularity of Whieldon-style tortoiseshell wares and of historic Staffordshire pottery in general, and the high prices they fetch on the market, there has long been a problem of forgery. In more modern times, forgery of Whieldon wares dates back at least until the 1920s when his work commanded high prices.

In 1991 a lawsuit brought a forgery to light when the authenticity of a Whieldon-type candelabrum was called into question. This piece had been vetted by experts before being bought from an English dealer on behalf of an American collector. However, the use of thermoluminescence dating showed that it was modern.

== Enduring reputation ==
Thomas Whieldon's works have long been treasured by collectors and have realised high prices for at least the past century.

In 2011, Edmund de Waal selected a Thomas Whieldon teapot of 1760 for his celebration of the potter's art.

== Museum collections ==
- British Museum, London
- Metropolitan Museum of Art, New York
- Victoria & Albert Museum, London
- The Potteries Museum & Art Gallery, Stoke-on-Trent. Well represented but online catalogue appears to be under development.

== Portrait of Thomas Whieldon ==
The Wedgwood Museum, Barlaston, Staffordshire holds the only known portrait of Thomas Whieldon.
