= Creamware =

Cream-coloured, refined earthenware with a lead glaze over a pale body

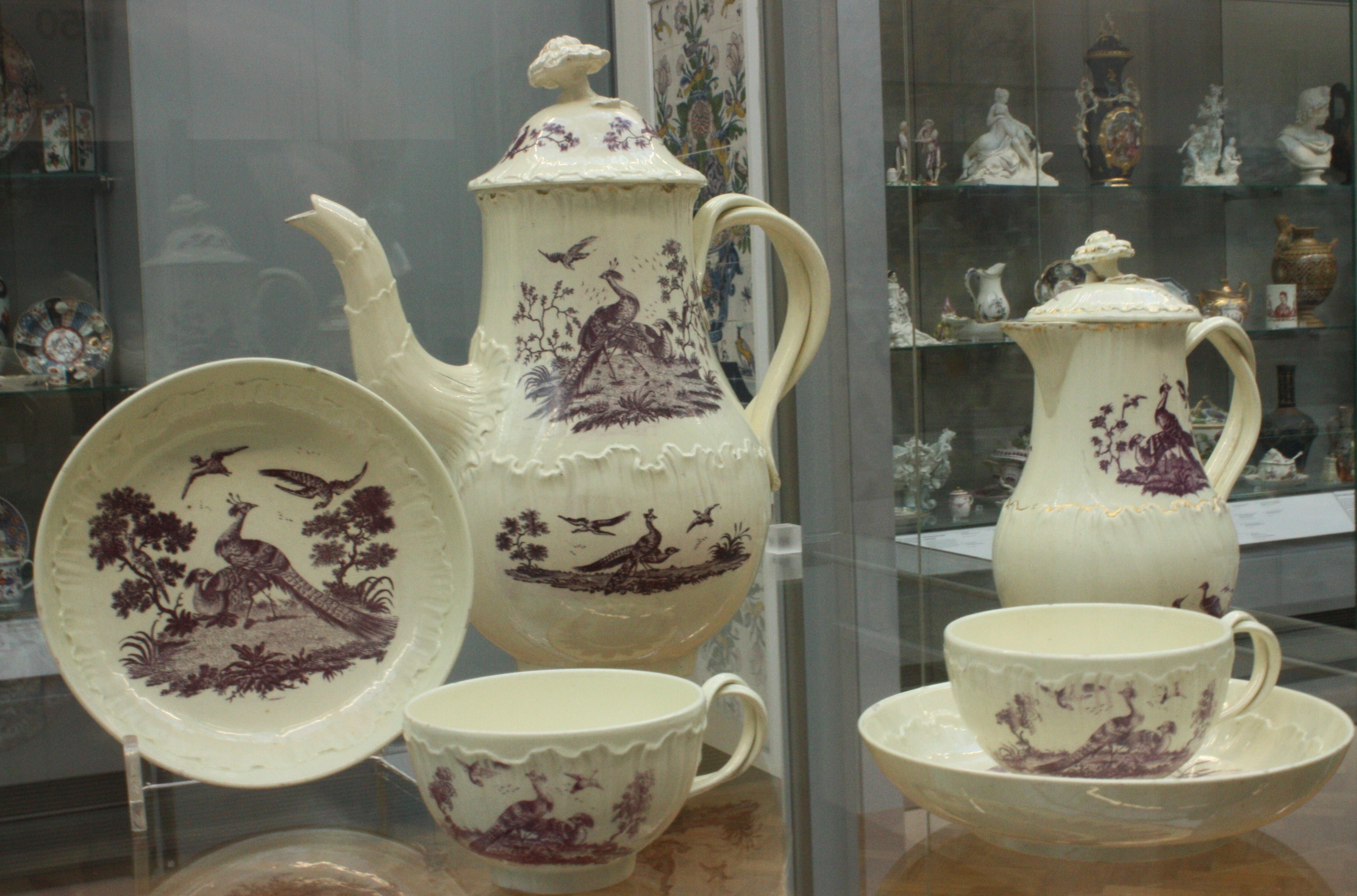
Josiah Wedgwood: Tea and coffee service, c. 1775. Transfer-printed in purple enamel by Guy Green of Liverpool. Victoria & Albert Museum, London

Creamware is a cream-coloured refined earthenware with a lead glaze over a pale body, known in France as faïence fine, in the Netherlands as Engels porselein, and in Italy as terraglia inglese. It was created about 1750 by the potters of Staffordshire, England, who refined the materials and techniques of salt-glazed earthenware towards a finer, thinner, whiter body with a brilliant glassy lead glaze, which proved so ideal for domestic ware that it supplanted white salt-glaze wares by about 1780. It was popular until the 1840s.

Variations of creamware were known as "tortoiseshell ware" or "Whieldon ware" were developed by the master potter Thomas Whieldon with coloured stains under the glaze. It served as an inexpensive substitute for the soft-paste porcelains being developed by contemporary English manufactories, initially in competition with Chinese export porcelains. It was often made in the same fashionable and refined styles as porcelain.

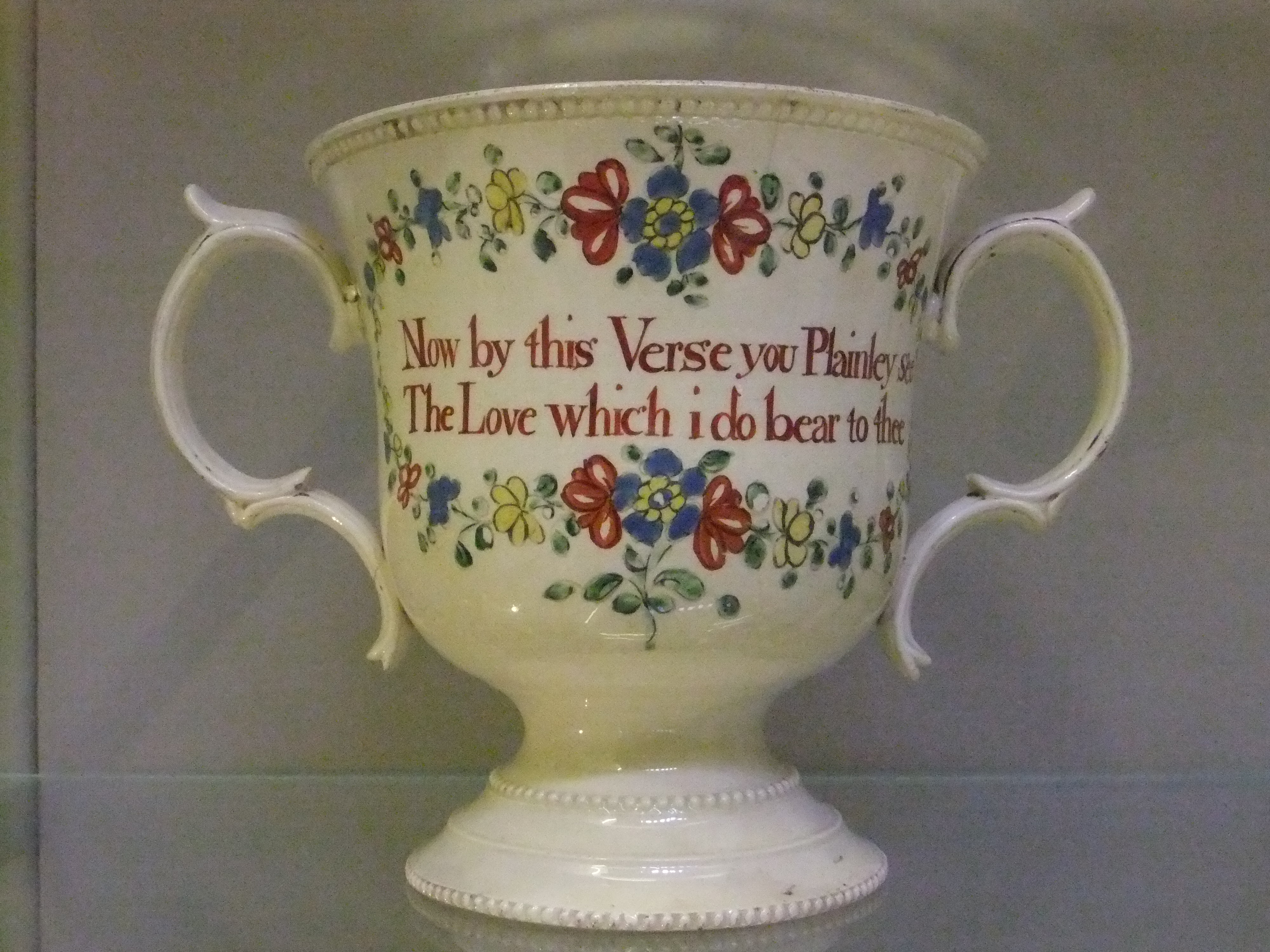
English loving-cup, 1774

The most notable producer of creamware was Josiah Wedgwood, who perfected the ware, beginning during his partnership with Thomas Whieldon. Wedgwood supplied his creamware to Queen Charlotte and Catherine the Great (in the famous Frog Service) and used the trade name Queen's ware. Later, around 1779, he was able to lighten the cream colour to a bluish white by using cobalt in the lead overglaze. Wedgwood sold this more desirable product under the name pearl ware. The Leeds Pottery (producing "Leedsware") was another very successful producer.

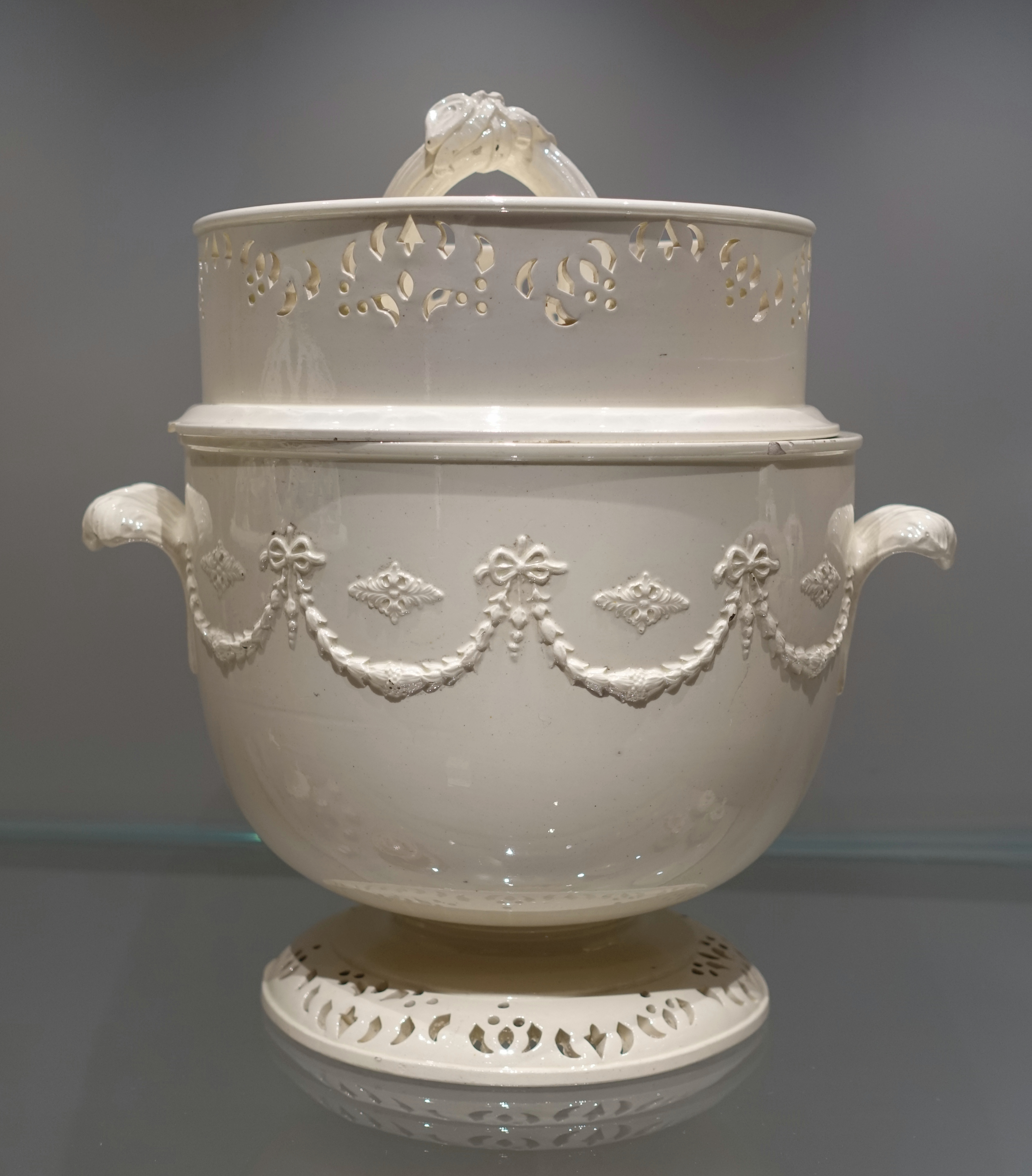
Wedgwood ice-bucket (glacier) in three parts, 1770–1775, Queen's ware

Wedgwood and his English competitors sold creamware throughout Europe, sparking local industries, that largely replaced tin-glazed faience. and to the United States. One contemporary writer and friend of Wedgwood claimed it was ubiquitous. This led to local industries developing throughout Europe to meet demand. There was also a strong export market to the United States. The success of creamware had killed the demand for tin-glazed earthenware and pewter vessels alike and the spread of cheap, good-quality, mass-produced creamware to Europe had a similar impact on Continental tin-glazed faience factories. By the 1780s Josiah Wedgwood was exporting as much as 80% of his output to Europe.

== Materials and production ==
Creamware is made from white clays from Dorset and Devon combined with an amount of calcined flint. This body is the same as that used for salt-glazed stoneware, but it is fired to a lower temperature (around 800 °C as opposed to 1,100 to 1,200 °C) and glazed with lead to form a cream-coloured earthenware. The white clays ensured a white colour after firing and the addition of calcined flint improved its thermal shock resistance, whilst the calcined flint in the glazes helped prevent crazing.

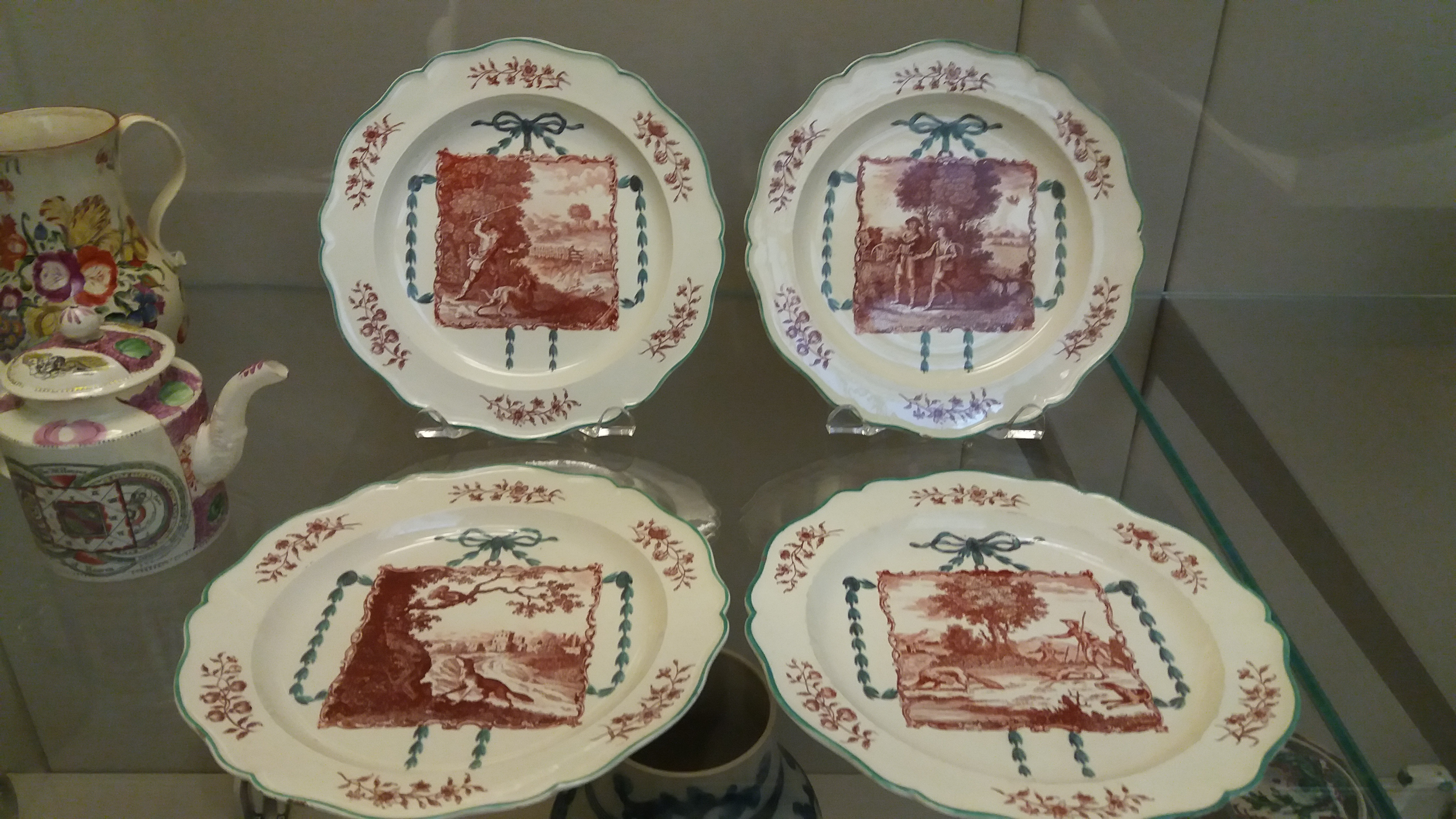
Josiah Wedgwood: Four creamware plates depicting Aesop's Fables. Burslem, about 1771–1775. Printed by Guy Green, Liverpool. On display at the British Museum, London.

== Development ==
Creamware was first produced some time before 1740. Originally lead powder or galena, mixed with a certain amount of ground calcined flint, was dusted on the ware, which was then given its one and only firing. This early method was unsatisfactory because the use of lead compounds resulted in lead poisoning among the potters, and the dry grinding of calcined flint caused a form of silicosis colloquially known as potter's rot.

Around 1740 a fluid glaze in which the ingredients were mixed and ground in water was invented, possibly by Enoch Booth of Tunstall, Staffordshire, according to one early historian, although this is disputed. The method involved first firing the ware to a biscuit state, and then glazing and re-firing it.

Foremost of the pioneers of creamware in the Staffordshire Potteries was Thomas Whieldon. Although he has become popularly associated almost exclusively with tortoiseshell creamware, in fact he produced a wide variety of creamware. He first mentions 'Cream Colour' in 1749.

The young Josiah Wedgwood was in partnership with Thomas Whieldon from 1754 to 1759 and after Wedgwood had left to set up independently at Ivy House, he immediately directed his efforts to the development of creamware.

Wedgwood rebelled against the use of coloured glazes, declaring as early as 1766 that he was clearing his warehouse of coloured ware as he was 'heartily sick of the commodity'.

Wedgwood improved creamware by introducing china clay into both the body and glaze and so was able to produce creamware of a much paler colour, lighter and stronger and more delicately worked, perfecting the ware by about 1770. His superior creamware, known as 'Queen's ware', was supplied to Queen Charlotte and Catherine the Great and later became hugely popular. There were few changes to creamware after about 1770 and the Wedgwood formula was gradually adopted by most manufacturers.

== Pearlware ==
One important ware of note however is pearlware, of which there was an increase around 1779. Pearlware is distinct from creamware in having a blue-tinged glaze produced by the use of cobalt and a body somewhat modified to produce a ware that was slightly greyish in appearance. Pearlware was developed in order to meet demand for substitutes for Chinese porcelain amongst the growing middle classes of the time. By around 1808 a fully whitened version of creamware (known as White Ware) was introduced to meet changing market demand.

== Forms ==
During the partnership between Thomas Whieldon and Josiah Wedgwood from 1754 to 1759, moulded creamware in a variety of forms was developed, especially in collaboration with the talented block-cutter William Greatbatch, who produced a variety of Cauliflower, Pineapple, Fruit Basket and other popular wares. There was considerable inventiveness of form and the use of moulds allowed both greater complexity and ease of mass-production. Several creamware types used moulds originally produced for the earlier salt-glazed stoneware goods, such as the typical plates illustrated opposite. Combined with increasingly sophisticated decorative techniques, creamware quickly became established as the preferred ware for the dinner table amongst both middle and upper classes.

== Decoration ==
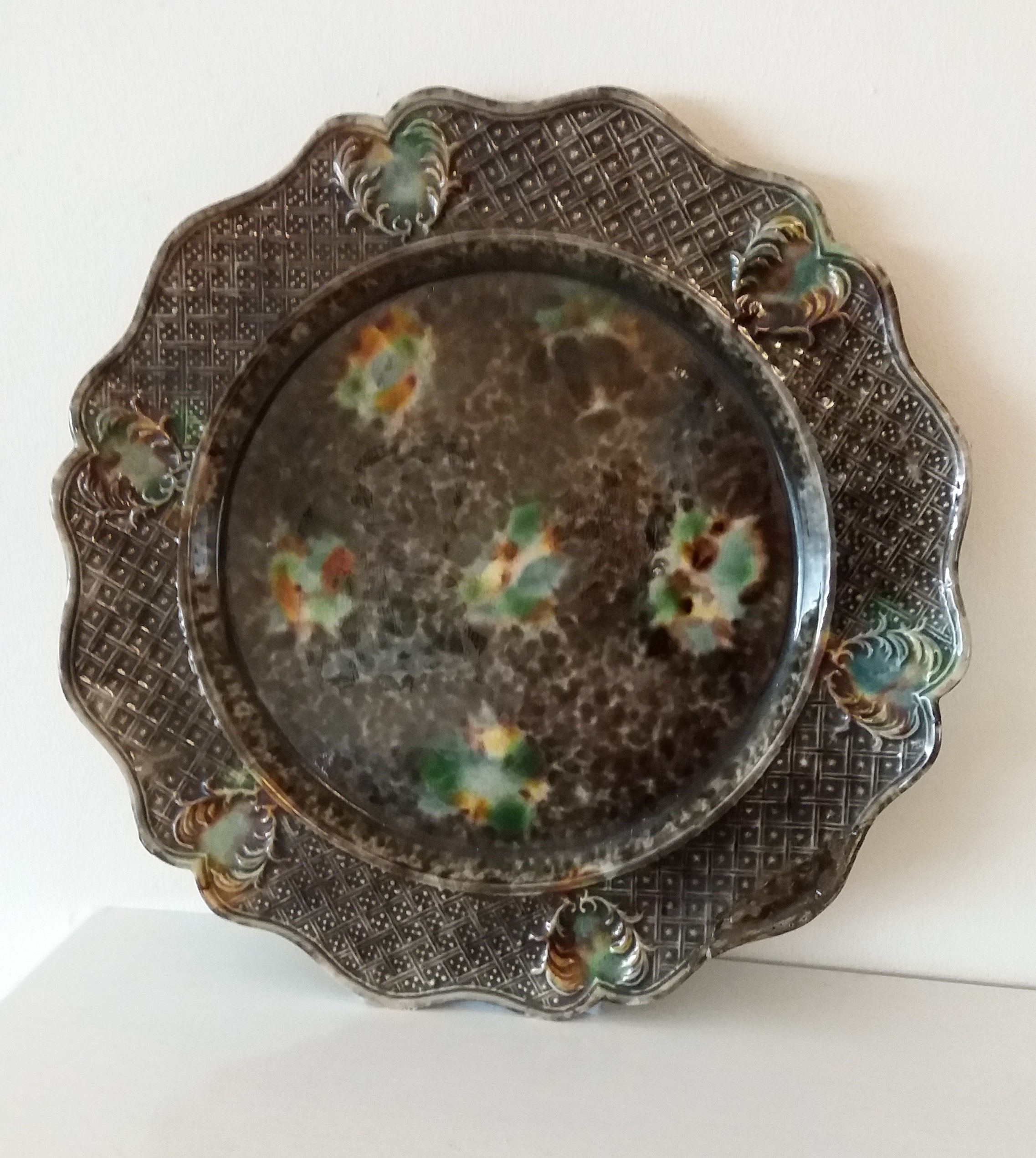
An early tortoiseshell-decorated creamware plate. Perhaps from the factory of Thomas Whieldon, but not attributable. Private collection

Creamware during the 18th century was decorated in a variety of ways:

=== Lead-powder ===
The early process of using lead-powder produced a brilliant, transparent glaze of a rich cream colour. Small stamped motifs similar to those used at the time on salt-glaze wares and redware were sometimes applied to the ware for decoration. Dry crystals of metallic oxides such as copper, iron and manganese were then dusted onto the ware to form patches of coloured decoration during firing.

=== Tortoiseshell method ===
The early lead-powder process led directly to the development of the tortoiseshell method and other coloured glazes which were used with the new fluid glazes. Here, patches of colour were sponged or painted onto the biscuit surface before a clear glaze was applied to the whole and then fired. Coloured decoration could help disguise imperfections that might arise during the firing process.

=== Transfer-printing ===
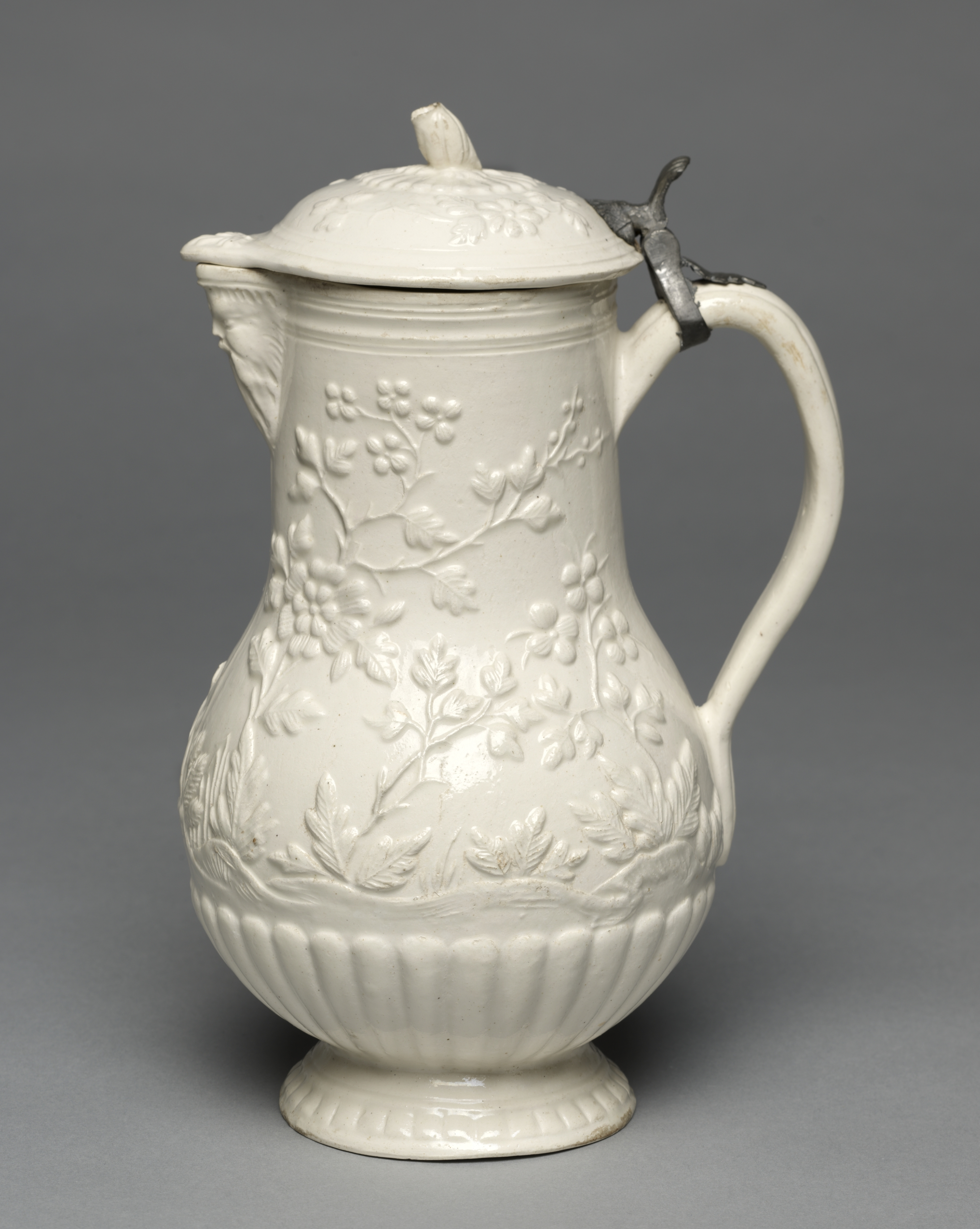
Jug, c. 1765 by the Pont-aux-Choux factory near Paris, one of the first and best French makers of faience fine, as creamware was known.

Transfer-printing of pottery was developed in the 1750s. There were two main methods, underglaze printing and overglaze. For overglaze printing, an engraved copper plate was prepared and rubbed with oil. The surplus oil was wiped off and an impression was taken onto thin paper. The oily print was then transferred to the glazed earthenware surface which was then dusted with finely ground pigment in the chosen colour. Excess powder was then removed and the ware was given a short firing in a muffle kiln to soften the glaze, burn off the oil and leave the printed image firmly bonded to the surface.

This method could be varied by transferring the oily print onto a 'glue-bat' – a slab of flexible gelatine that could be laid on the workbench whilst a globular pot was carefully rolled over it. Glue-bats allowed more subtle engraving techniques to be used. Underglaze transfer printing was also sometimes used, directly onto the porous biscuit body.

Transfer-printing was specialist and so generally outsourced in the early years: Sadler & Green of Liverpool were exclusive printers to Josiah Wedgwood by 1763, for example.

=== Enamelling ===
By 1760 creamware was often enamelled for decoration, using a technique adopted from the early porcelain industry. This consisted of painting overglaze on the ware with pigments made from finely powdered coloured glass and then firing again to fuse the enamel to the ware. The varied enamel colours did not fuse at the same temperature so several firings were generally needed, adding to the expense.

== Manufacturers and attribution ==
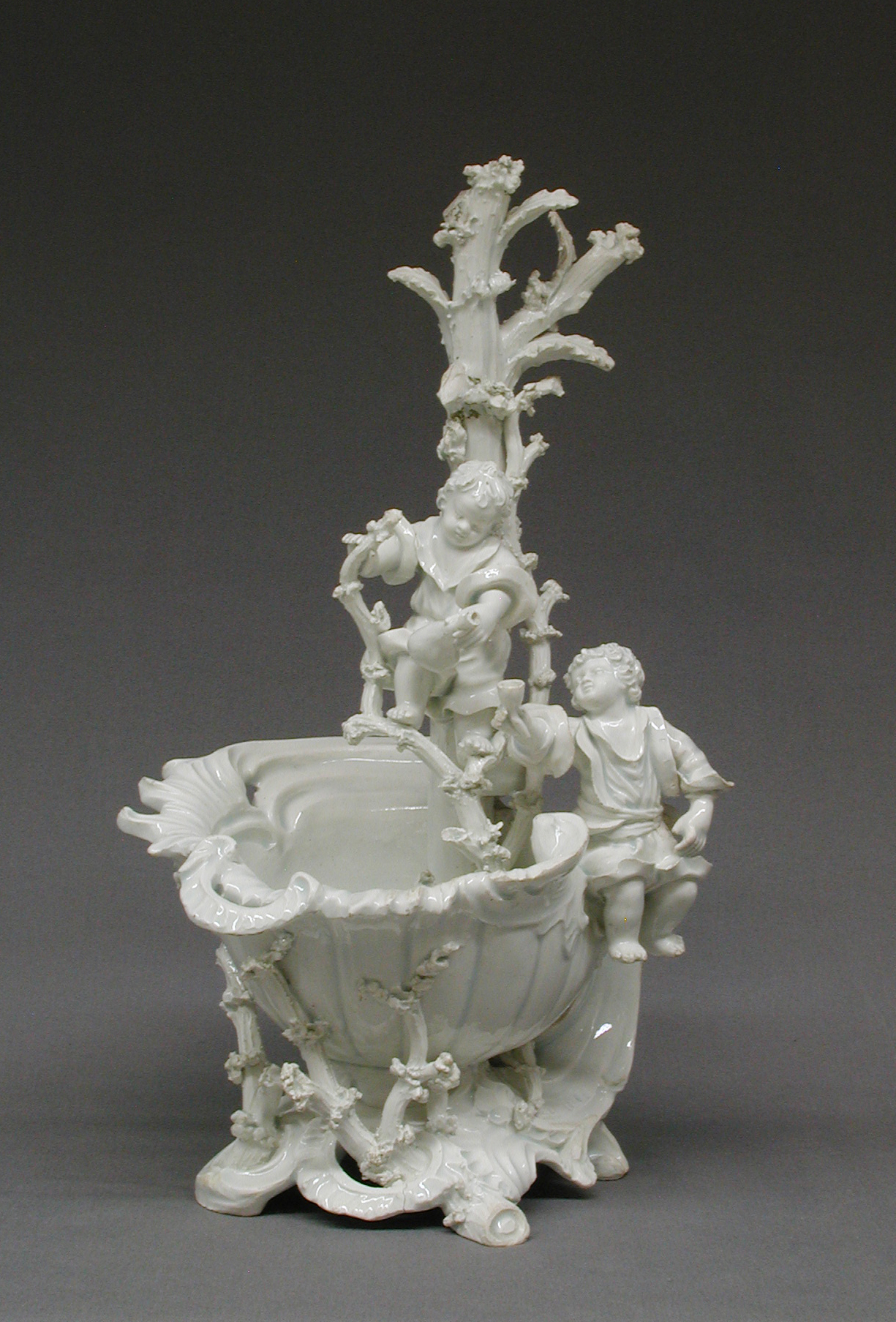
Le Nove (Venetian) terraglia group, c. 1786

There were approximately 130 potteries in North Staffordshire during the 1750s, rising to around 150 by 1763 and employing up to 7,000 people – a large number of these potteries would have been producing creamware.

Whilst Staffordshire had taken the lead, creamware came to be developed in a number of large potting centres where stoneware was already being produced, eventually replacing stoneware entirely. These included Derbyshire, Liverpool, Yorkshire (including the Leeds pottery) and Swansea.

Attribution of pieces to particular factories has always been difficult because virtually no creamware was marked prior to Josiah Wedgwood's manufacture of it in Burslem. At the time manufacturers frequently supplied wares to one another to supplement stocks and ideas were often exchanged or copied. In addition, factories usually sent out their wares to outside specialist enamellers or transfer-printers for decoration – decoration in-house was only gradually adopted. For this reason, several manufacturers usually shared the same decorator or printer and tended to use the same or very similar patterns.

Collectors, dealers and curators alike were frustrated in their efforts to ascribe pots to individual factories: it is frequently impossible to do so. Archaeological excavations of pottery sites in Staffordshire and elsewhere have helped provide some better-established typology to enable progress in attribution.

== Terraglia ==
Italian versions of creamware were known as terraglia, or creta all'uso inglese ("earthenware in the English manner"). They were produced in many factories, including by the Naples porcelain factory.

== Decline ==
The heyday of creamware ran from about 1770 to the rise of painted pearlwares, white wares and stone chinas in the period around 1810 to 1825. Although creamware continued to be produced during the later period, it was no longer pre-eminent in the markets.
