= Richard Turner =

Richard Turner may refer to:

== Politicians ==
- Richard C. Turner (1927–1986), American politician, who served Senator and Attorney General of Iowa
- Richard Turner (New Jersey politician), American politician, and Mayor of Weehawken, New Jersey
- Richard Turner (Kentucky politician) (born 1935), member of the Kentucky House of Representatives
- Richard Turner (MP for Reigate) for Reigate
- Richard Turner (Canadian politician) (1843–1917), Canadian merchant and politician
- Richard Turner (MP for Bletchingley) (fl.1390s), MP for Bletchingley

== Sports ==
- Dick Turner (1932–2008), Australian rugby league footballer, coach and administrator
- Dick Turner (footballer) (1866–after 1891), Wrexham A.F.C. and Wales international footballer
- Richard Turner (footballer) (1882–1960), British footballer
- Richard Turner (Worcestershire cricketer) (1886–1967), English cricketer
- Richard Turner (Cambridge University cricketer) (1932–2023), English cricketer
- Richard Turner (American football) (born 1959), American football player
- Richard Turner (rugby union) (born 1968), New Zealand rugby union player

== Others ==
- Richard Turner (reformer) (before 1554–1565?), English Protestant reformer and Marian exile
- Richard Turner (rector) (1724–1791), English divine and author
- Richard Turner (writer) (1753–1788), English author
- Richard Turner (iron-founder) (1798–1881), Irishman
- Richard Turner (geologist) (1856–1940), Scottish physician, archaeologist and geologist
- Richard Turner (Canadian Army officer) (1871–1961), Canadian soldier
- Richard Turner (artist) (1940–2013), British poet and artist, also known as Turneramon
- Richard Turner (Australian artist), Australian artist in the Progressive Art Movement in Adelaide in the 1970s
- Richard Turner (magician) (born 1954), American card technician and poker player
- Richard Turner (computer scientist) (born 1954), American university professor
- Richard Turner (producer) (active from 2008), British radio producer
- Richard Turner (musician) (1984–2011)
- Richard E. Turner (1920–1986), fighter pilot
- Rick Turner (philosopher) (1942–1978), South African academic and anti-apartheid activist
- Rick Turner (luthier) (1943–2022), American builder of guitars and basses
- Richmond K. Turner, (1885–1961), American admiral during World War II
