= Thomas Turner (potter) =

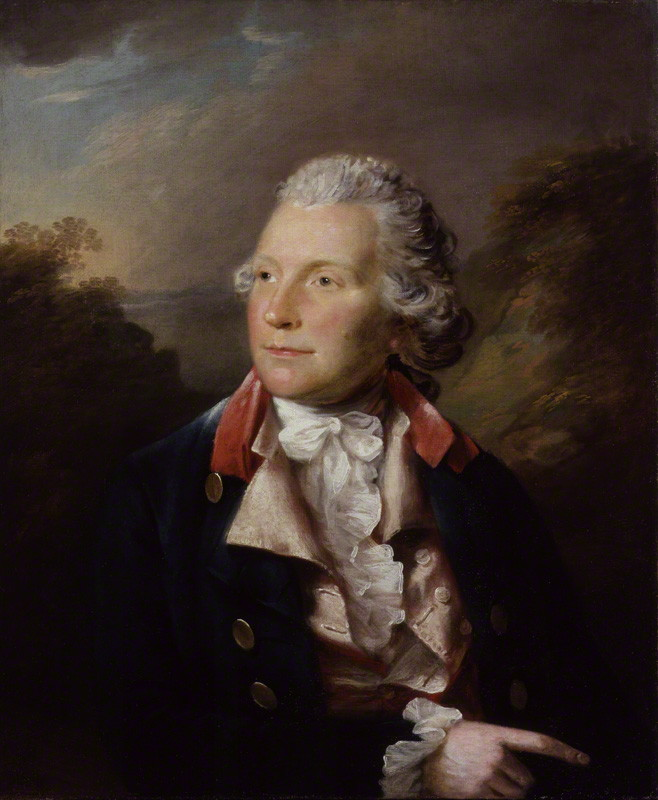
Thomas Turner by Lemuel Francis Abbott.

Thomas Turner (1749 – February 1809) was an English potter. He was the lessee of the celebrated Salopian porcelain company, or Caughley manufactory, during the later decades of the 18th century. He is not to be confused with the potter John Turner (1737-1787) and his family, of Lane End, Staffordshire, who were active in the same period.

== Biography ==
Turner was born in 1749, was the eldest son of Richard Turner (1724?–1791), vicar of Elmley Castle, Worcestershire, by his wife Sarah. Richard Turner (1753–1788) was his younger brother. It has been supposed that Thomas was brought up as a silversmith. He was, however, only formally apprenticed to his father, to qualify him for the freedom of the city of Worcester. It is probable that he was early connected with the Worcester china works. He was an excellent chemist, was a thorough master of the various processes connected with porcelain manufacture, was a skillful draughtsman, designer, and engraver, and was also a clever musician. He was a magistrate for Shropshire and Staffordshire, and a freeman of Worcester, Much Wenlock, and Bridgnorth.

In 1772 Turner succeeded Ambrose Gallimore (brother-in-law of Josiah Spode) as lessee of the porcelain manufactory at Caughley in Shropshire. Gallimore had obtained the lease to the works, styled ‘The Salopian China Warehouse,’ in 1754, and under his management they had rapidly gained in repute. "In the early years of the Caughley manufactory, the ware was not many degrees removed from earthenware; but it gradually assumed a finer and more transparent character. Like the early Worcester examples, the patterns were principally confined to blue flowers, etc., on a white ground; and in this style and colour the Caughley works excelled, in many respects, their competitors."

On succeeding Gallimore, Turner set about enlarging the manufactory. He completed his improvements in 1775, and in 1780 visited France, in order to investigate the methods employed in the porcelain manufactories at Paris. He brought back several skilled workmen, who greatly aided him in his subsequent innovations. On his return he developed an early or predecessor form of the ‘willow pattern’, and about the same time produced the ‘Brosely blue dragon pattern.’ This "willow" pattern was not, however, the later standard willow pattern with bridge and fence in the foreground - which the Caughley factory never produced, (an imitation in transferware of a pattern popular in hand-painted chinese imported wares), nor was it the pattern known as "Turner's willow", which was developed by John and William Turner of Lane End, Staffordshire towards the end of the 18th century.

In 1783 Turner married Dorothy Gallimore, daughter of William and niece of Ambrose Gallimore. However she died in 1794 without surviving issue, and he made a second marriage, in 1796, to Mary, daughter of Thomas Milner and widow of Henry Alsop. In 1798 or 1799 he retired from the business, which passed into the hands of John Rose, a former apprentice, who carried it on together with his own works at Coalport under the title Rose & Co. The works were finally abandoned in 1814 or 1815, chiefly owing to difficulties of transport and to the failure of the coal supply.

Turner died in February 1809, and was buried in the family vault at Barrow, Shropshire. Mary Turner his widow died at Bridgnorth on 20 November 1816, leaving a son and daughter.
