= William Wilkie =

Scottish church minister and poet (1721–1772)

William Wilkie (5 October 1721 – 10 October 1772) was a Scottish Church of Scotland minister and Professor of Natural Philosophy. Primarily remembered as a poet nicknamed Potato Willie, but known more respectfully as the "Scottish Homer", he contributed to Scotland's 18th-century Vernacular Revival. The son of a farmer, he was born in West Lothian and educated at Edinburgh. In 1757 he produced the Epigoniad, dealing with the Epigoni, sons of seven heroes who fought against Thebes. He also wrote Moral Fables in Verse.

== Life ==
The son of James Wilkie, a farmer, he was born at Echline Farm, in the parish of Dalmeny, West Lothian. He was educated at Dalmeny parish school and then studied at the University of Edinburgh, having among his college contemporaries John Home, David Hume, William Robertson, and Adam Smith. His father dying during his student days, he succeeded to the unexpired lease on a farm at Fishers' Tryste, near Edinburgh. This he carried on to support his three sisters and himself, at the same time continuing his studies for the ministry of the Church of Scotland.

Licensed as a Church of Scotland minister by the Presbytery of Linlithgow on 29 May 1745, he combined writing and agriculture with waiting for a congregation. On 17 May 1753 he was appointed under the patronage of the Earl of Lauderdale as assistant to Rev John Guthrie, parish minister of Ratho, Midlothian, on whose death in February 1756 he became sole incumbent. Eccentricity – his occasionally omitting, for instance, to take off his hat before entering the pulpit – somewhat marred the success of his pastorate.

In November 1759 he was appointed Professor of Natural Philosophy at the University of St Andrews, where he devoted his leisure to experiments in moorland farming. In 1766 the university conferred on Wilkie the honorary degree of Doctor of Divinity. He died of ague on 10 October 1772. Robert Fergusson, one of his students, eulogised him in a memorial eclogue.

== Works and reputation ==
In 1757 Wilkie published in nine books The Epigoniad, based on the fourth book of the Iliad and written in heroic couplets like Alexander Pope's Homer. To a second edition in 1759 he appended an ingenious apologetic "Dream in the manner of Spenser". This edition gained warm praise for The Epigoniad from David Hume, in a letter to The Critical Review, complaining that the journal had unduly depreciated the poem when first published. He gains a mention from a character in Tobias Smollett's epistolary novel The Expedition of Humphry Clinker as one of Scotland's "many authors of the first distinction... as agreeable in conversation as they are instructive and entertaining in their writings." In 1768 Wilkie published a small volume of 16 fables in iambic tetrameter reminiscent of John Gay, with a "Dialogue between the Author and a Friend" in heroics. The 16th, "The Hare and the Partan" (i. e. crab), is in Midlothian Scots.

Seen by contemporaries as very able, Wilkie impressed and shocked them. On meeting him at Alexander Carlyle's in 1759, Charles Townshend commented that no man of his acquaintance "approached so near the two extremes of a god and a brute." Credited with parsimony, Wilkie said he had learned economy by having "shaken hands with poverty up to the very elbow." On his death he left an estate worth £3,000.
