= Walter Leonard Bell =

Scottish surgeon

Walter Leonard Bell FSA(Scot) FRSE (1865–1932) was a Scottish surgeon and antiquarian.

== Life ==
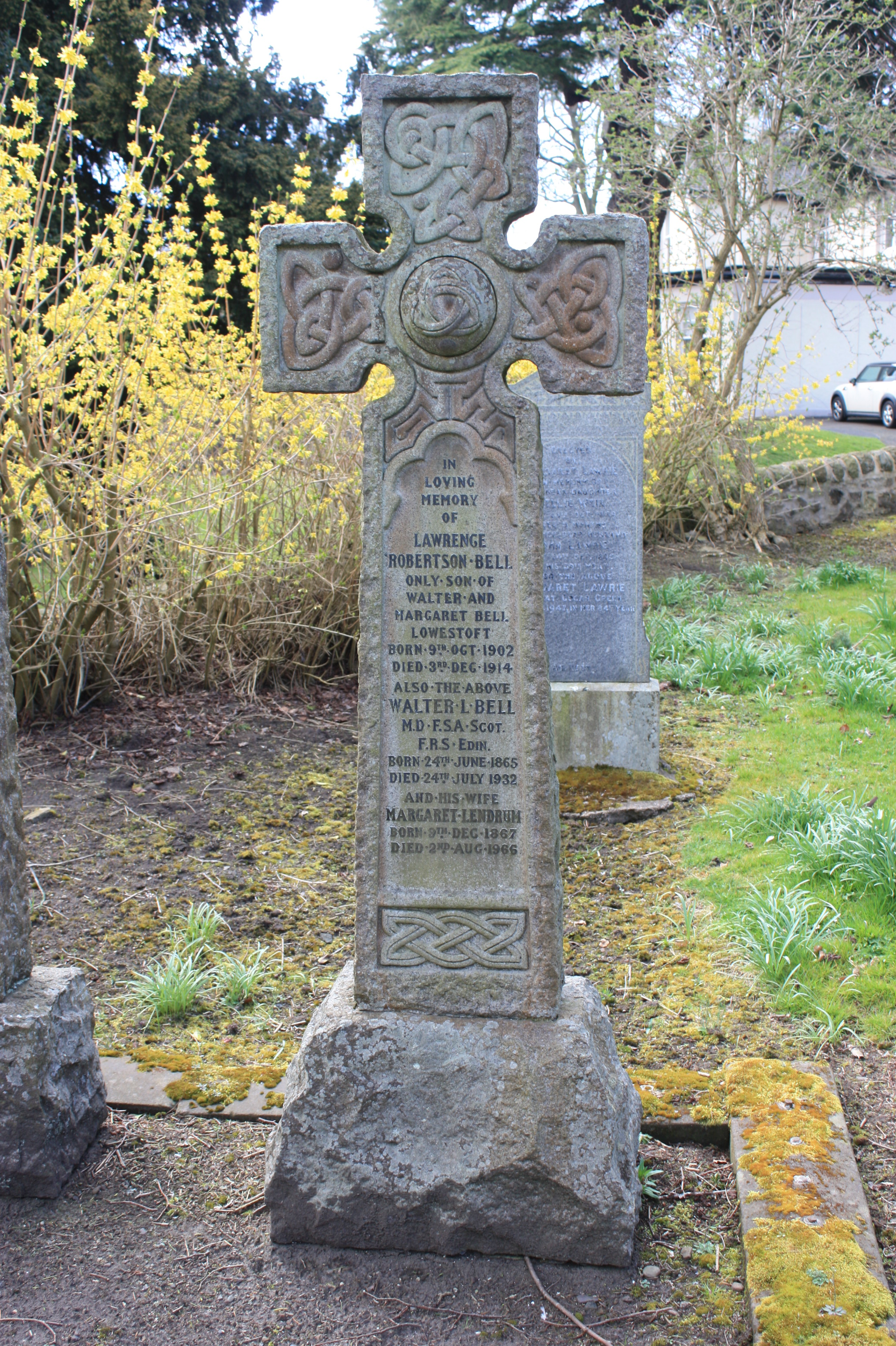
The grave of Bell in Ratho kirkyard

He was born on 24 June 1865 the son of Laurence Robertson Bell (1825–1898) of James Bell & Son, bell-hangers in Leith and his wife, Emma Isabel Turner Beech. The family lived at 1 Queen's Place in Leith.

He studied medicine at Edinburgh University. He worked as assistant physician at Larbert Asylum. He gained his doctorate (MD) in 1887. He then moved to the pioneer Cancer Hospital within the Royal Brompton Hospital as House Surgeon and appears to have been an early pioneer in the successful removal of tumours. He was made a Master of Surgery in 1893.

As an antiquarian and amateur archaeologist he was a member of the Cumberland and Westmoreland Antiquarian and Archaeological Society.

In March 1915 he was elected a Fellow of the Royal Society of Edinburgh. His proposers were James Currie, Sir Francis Grant Ogilvie, Henry Barnes and George Francis Scott-Elliot.

He served his final career years as Surgeon of Lowestoft Hospital. He died on 24 July 1932 and was buried with his son in Ratho kirkyard, west of Edinburgh.

== Family ==
He was married to Margaret Lendrum Scarth, daughter of Robert Scarth. Their only son, Lawrence Robertson Bell (1902–1914) died aged only 12.
