= Andrew Duncan (minister, born 1766) =

Andrew Duncan (1755–1827) was an 18th/19th century Church of Scotland minister who served as Moderator of the General Assembly in 1824.

== Life ==
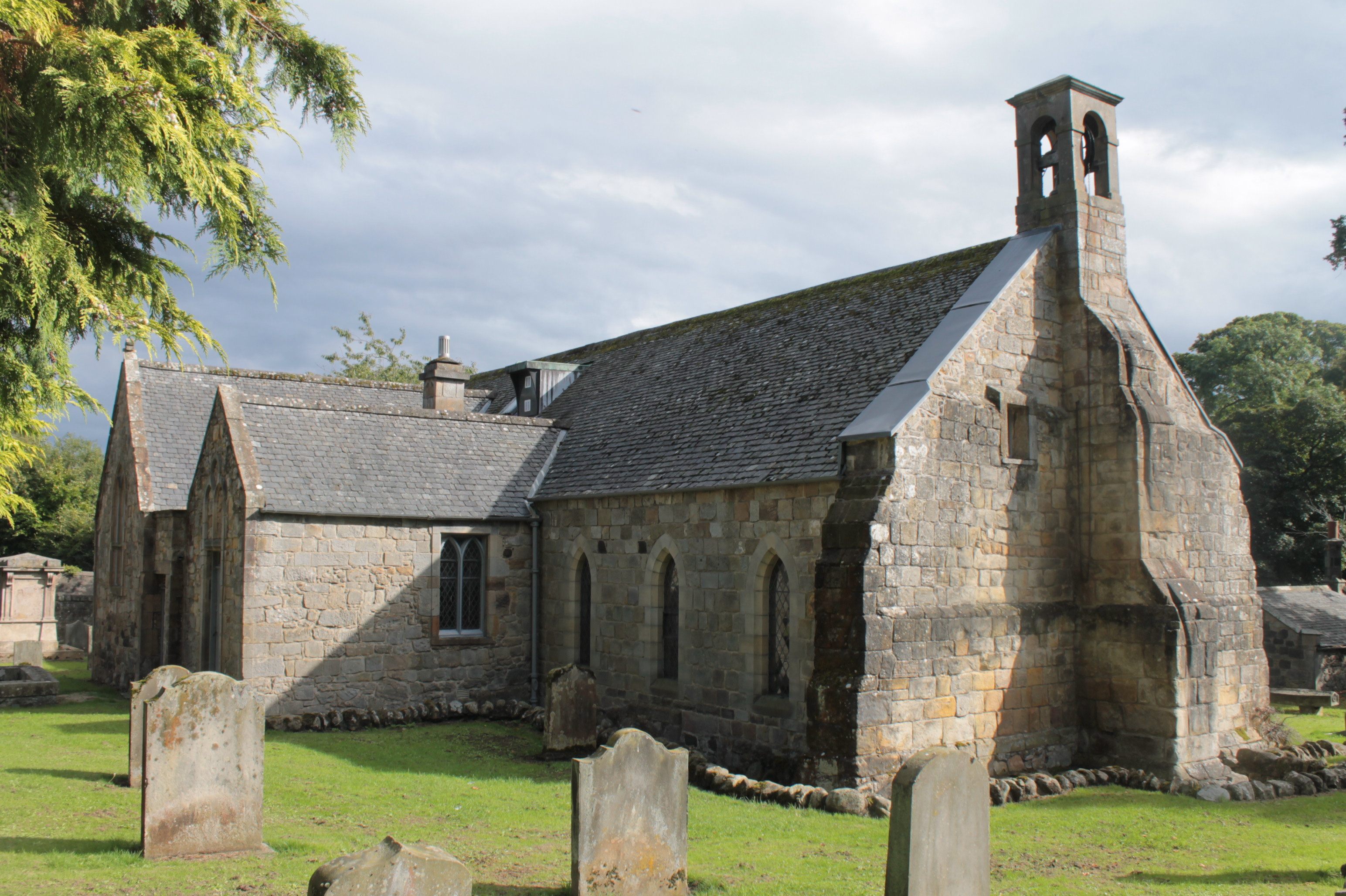
Ratho Church from the NW

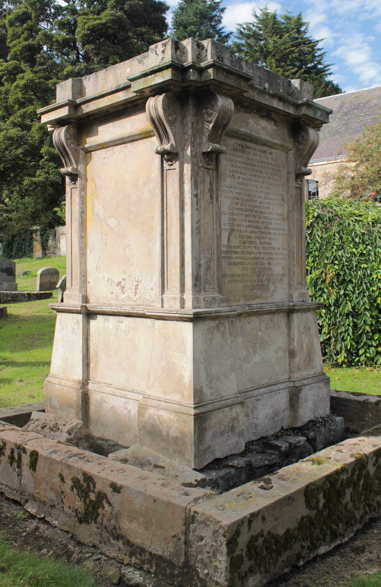
The grave of Very Rev Dr Andrew Duncan DD, Ratho churchyard

He was born in 1755 the son of Rev Patrick Duncan, minister of Tibbermore. He was licensed to preach by the Presbytery of Perth in July 1778.

He was ordained as minister of Auchterarder in September 1781. In September 1802 he was presented to the congregation of Ratho in West Lothian by his colleague Rev Dr Thomas Randall Davidson of Muirhouse and in March 1803 he translated to this new ministry.

In 1807 he was appointed as Principal Clerk of the General Assembly. In 1811 Edinburgh University awarded him an honorary Doctor of Divinity. In 1824 he succeeded Rev Alexander Brunton as Moderator of the General Assembly. He was succeeded in turn in 1825 by George Cook.

He died in Ratho on 29 July 1827. He is buried in the graveyard of his church with a large cuboid gravestone just north-east of the church.

== Family ==
In August 1786 he married Margaret Bethune, daughter of Rev Neil Bethune of Kennoway. Their ten children (eight daughters and two sons) included:

- Jean Duncan (b.1790) married Captain Duncan Ogilvy, died 1821 in India
- Christian (b.1791)
- Janet (b.1793)
- Hannah (b.1793) married Captain H A Montgomerie
- Margaret (b.1795)
- Catherine (b.1796)
- Andrew Bethune Duncan (b.1797) minister of Culross
- Susan (b.1798)
- Ann Mercer Duncan (b.1800) married James Craig surgeon in Ratho
- Grace (b.1802)
- James (b.1806)

== Publications ==
- The Benefits of Christianity (1806)
