= Ratho =

Village near Edinburgh Airport, Scotland

Coordinates: 55.922°N 3.379°W

Kingdom of Ratho: Scottish Gaelic: Ràthach
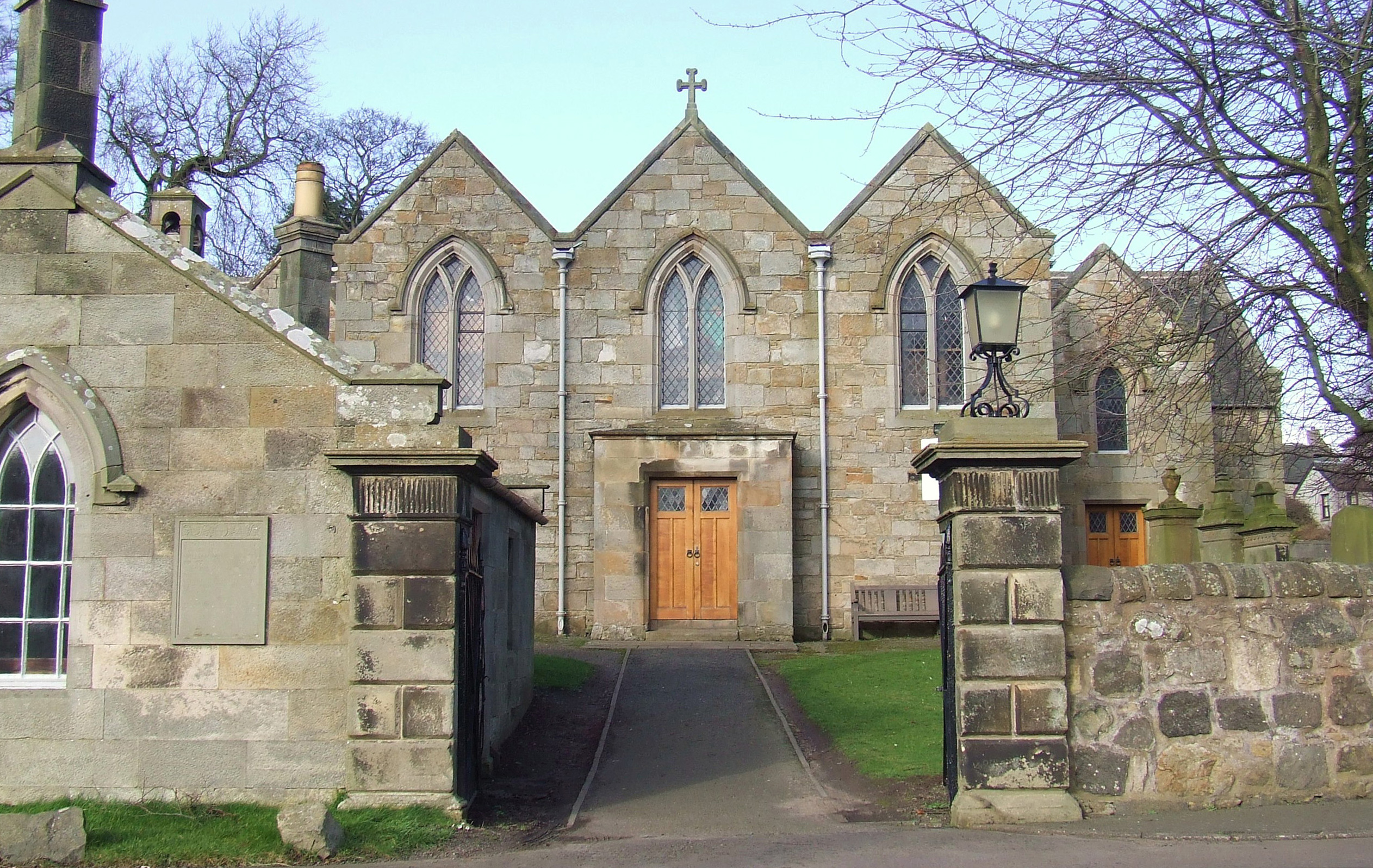
- St Mary's Kirk in Ratho

- Location within Edinburgh
- Population: 2,230 (2020)
- OS grid reference: NT1370
- Council area: Edinburgh
- Lieutenancy area: Edinburgh
- Country: Scotland
- Sovereign state: United Kingdom
- Post town: NEWBRIDGE
- Postcode district: EH28
- Dialling code: 0131
- Police: Scotland
- Fire: Scottish
- Ambulance: Scottish
- UK Parliament: Edinburgh West
- Scottish Parliament: Edinburgh Western

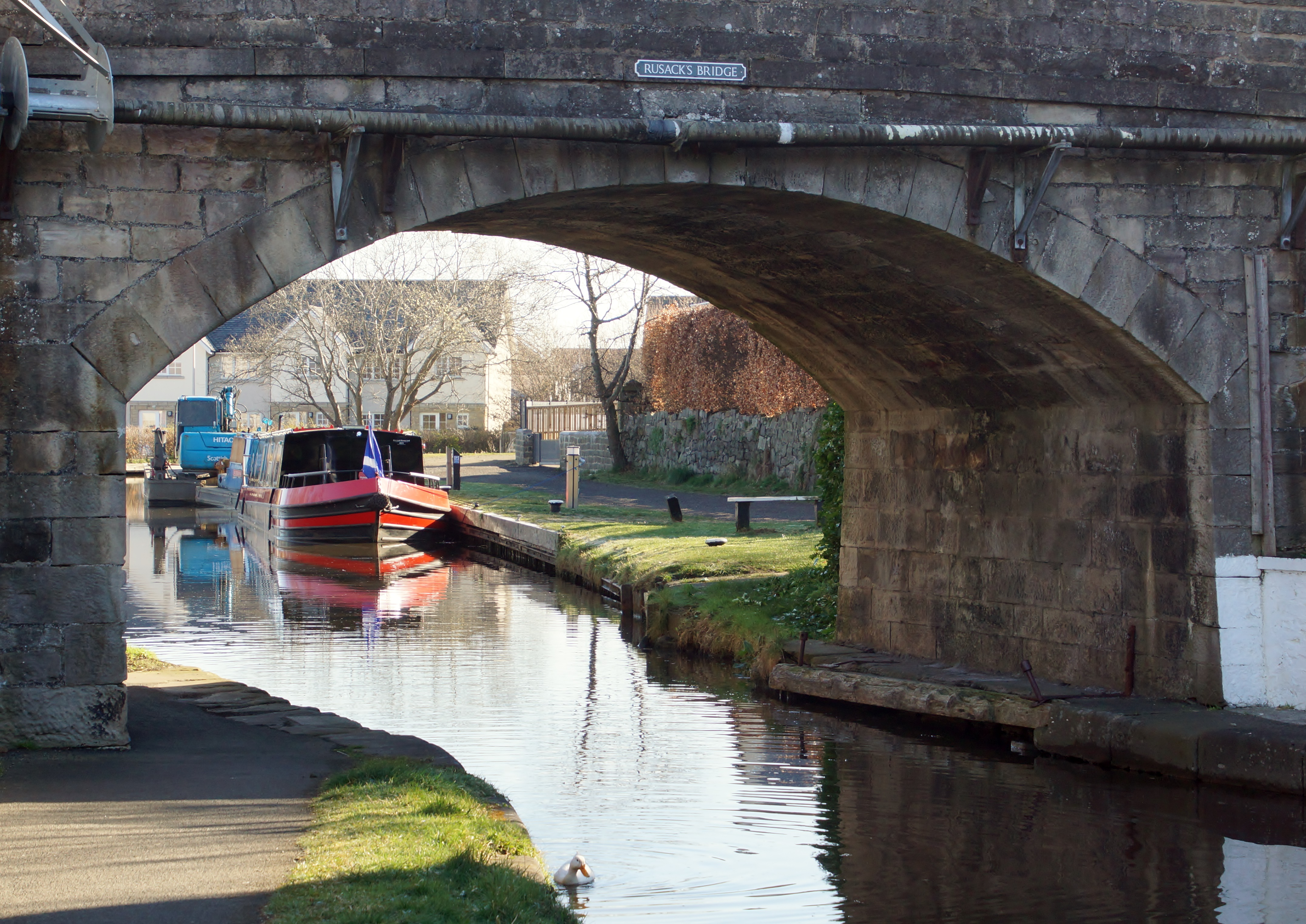
Rusack's Bridge (Bridge 15) on the Union Canal at Ratho

Ratho (Scottish Gaelic: Ràthach) is a village in the rural west part of the City of Edinburgh council area, Scotland. Its population at the 2011 census was 1,634 based on the 2010 definition of the locality. It was formerly in the old county of Midlothian. Ratho Station, Newbridge and Kirkliston are other villages in the area. The Union Canal passes through Ratho. Edinburgh Airport is situated only 4 miles (7 km) away. The village has a high ratio of its older houses built from whin stone due to a whin quarry nearby. The older, historical, part of the village was designated a Conservation Area.

== Origins ==
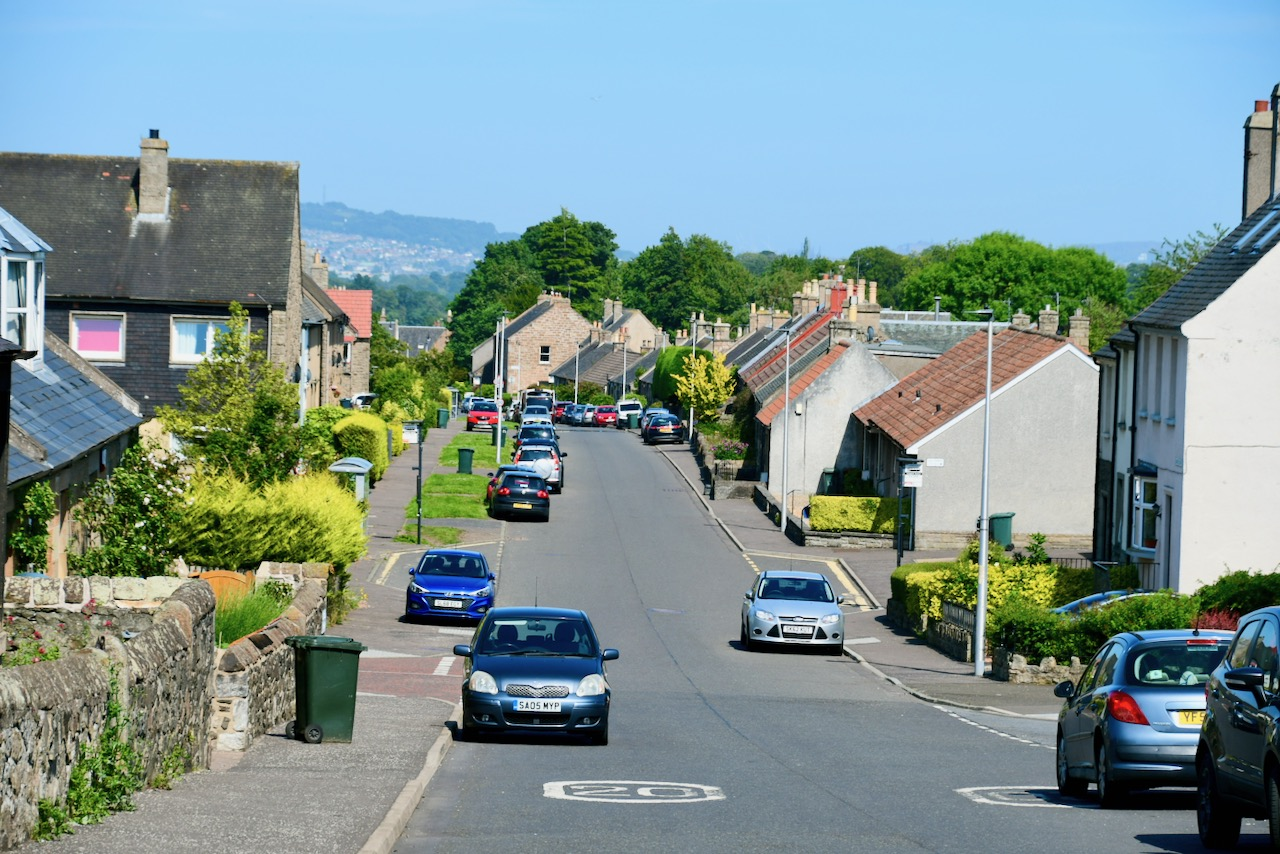
Main Street in Ratho, Scotland

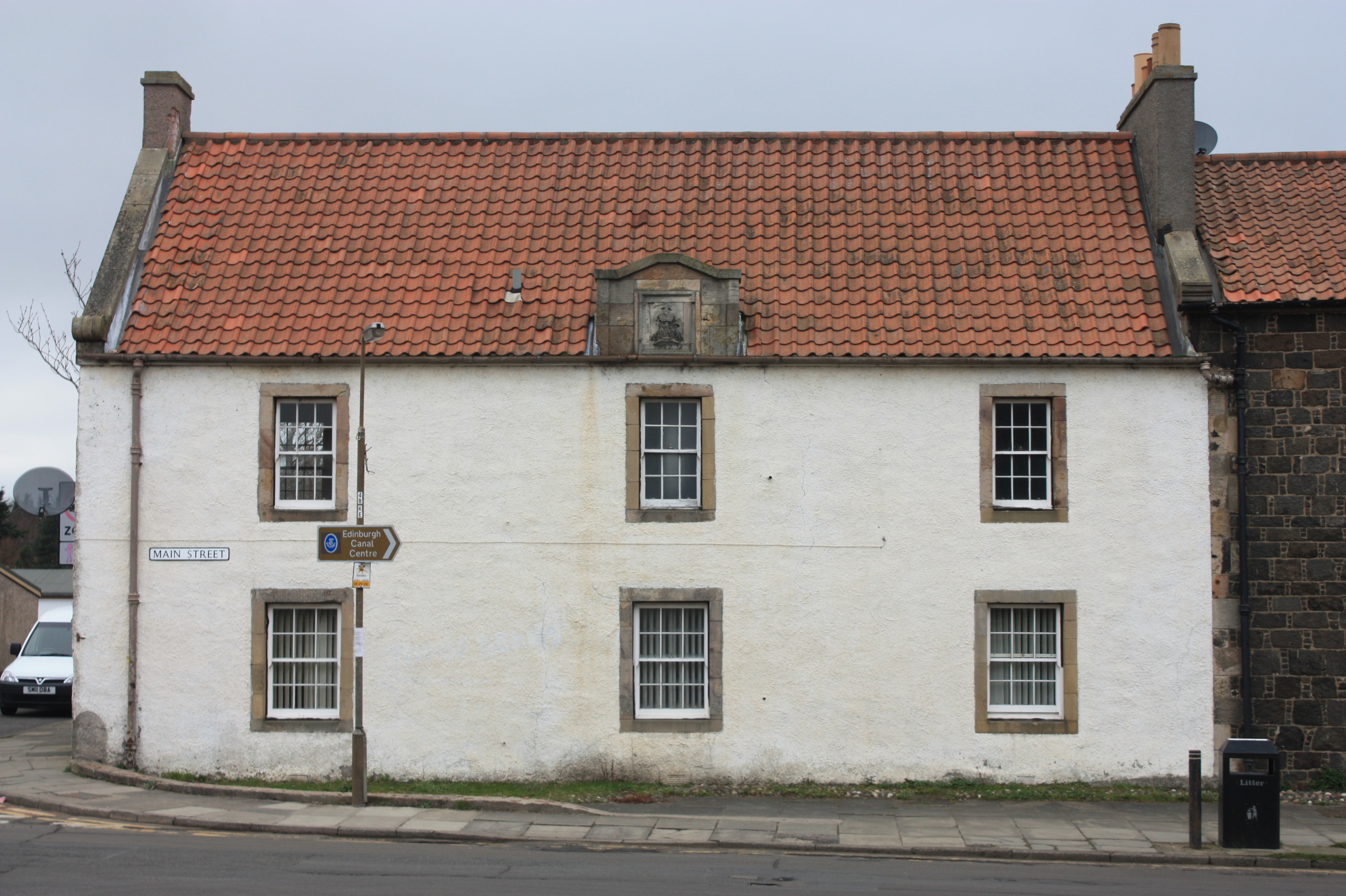
18th century house (c.1760) on Ratho Main St

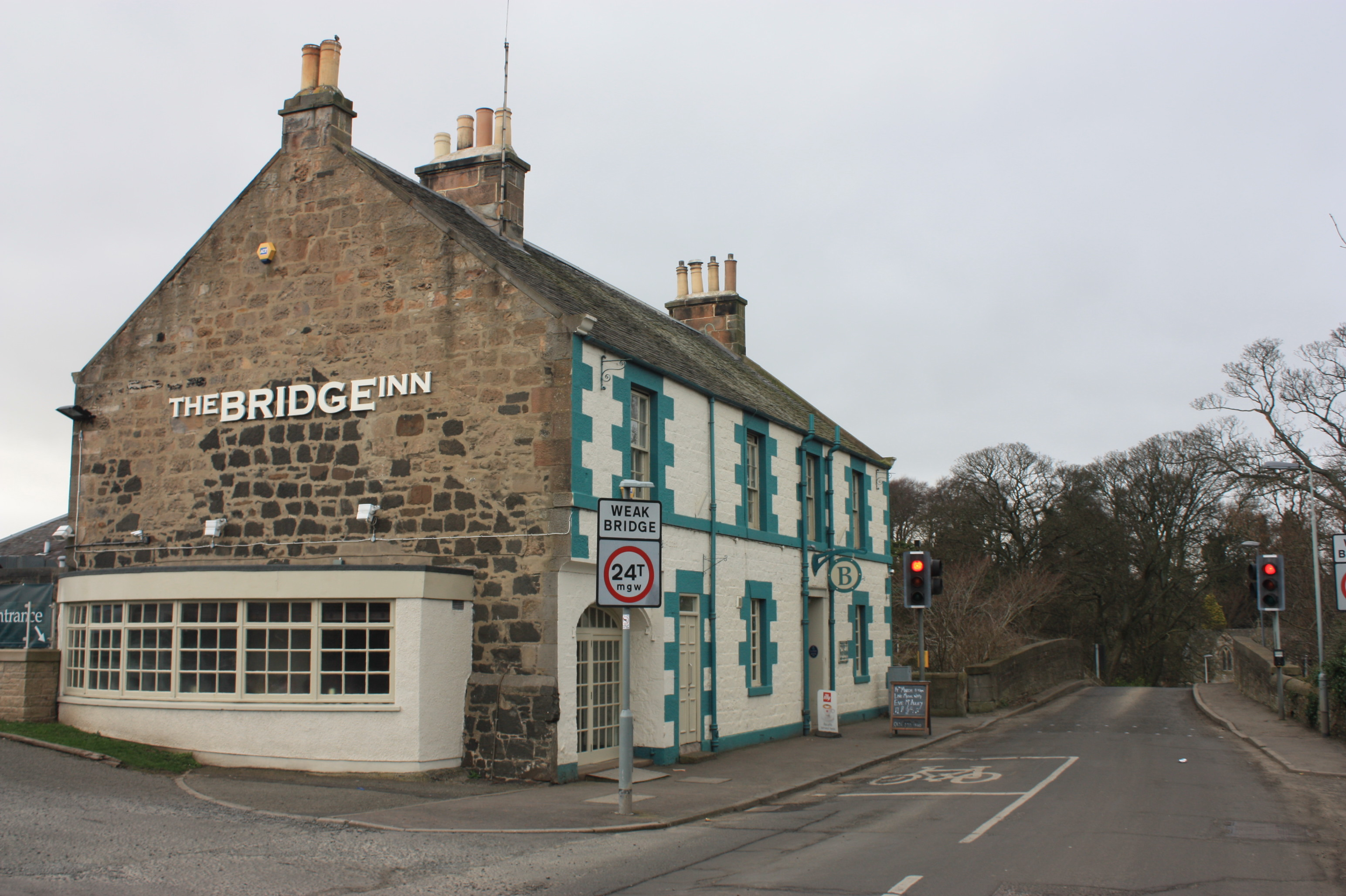
Bridge Inn, Ratho

Ratho appears in written records from 1243 with various spellings such as Rath (ewe, eu, ew, ow, au) but most consistently, from 1292, with its present name Ratho. Other places nearby having "Ratho" in their names include Ratho Byres, Ratho Park and Ratho Bank (now named Ashley).

It is believed that the name Ratho comes from Rath, Scottish Gaelic, for a place where there are hill forts. Both Kaimes and Dalmahoy hill forts are nearby.

To the southwest of the village, Tormain Hill is the site of Stone Age symbols carved into the rocks atop the hill and a 'witches' stone'. When the witches' stone was moved by the land owner for farming, it was believed evil spirits were released into the village.

== Haltoun House ==
There are a number of old buildings in the area. The most prominent of these was Haltoun House or castle (pronounced, and sometimes spelt, Hatton), which was badly damaged by fire in the mid-1950s and subsequently taken down. This magnificent country house evolved from its central core, a Norman keep, or what Scots call a Pele Tower. In 1371 the manor and lands of Haltoun were resigned to the Crown by John de Haltoun, and were regranted to Alan de Lawedre [Lauder] of that Ilk who then resided mostly at Whitslaid Tower just outside Lauder. Haltoun Tower was damaged during the House of Douglas troubles of 1452, when a note in the Treasurers' Accounts show funds being provided for its repair. The Haltoun estates remained in the Lauder family until the latter half of the 17th century when they passed by marriage to Charles Maitland, 3rd Earl of Lauderdale, who enlarged and beautified Hatton House.

== Religion and education ==
Ratho has a primary school and a public library. The public library was closed during the COVID-19 pandemic but a replacement library was opened in July 2025.

=== Parish Church (St Mary's) ===
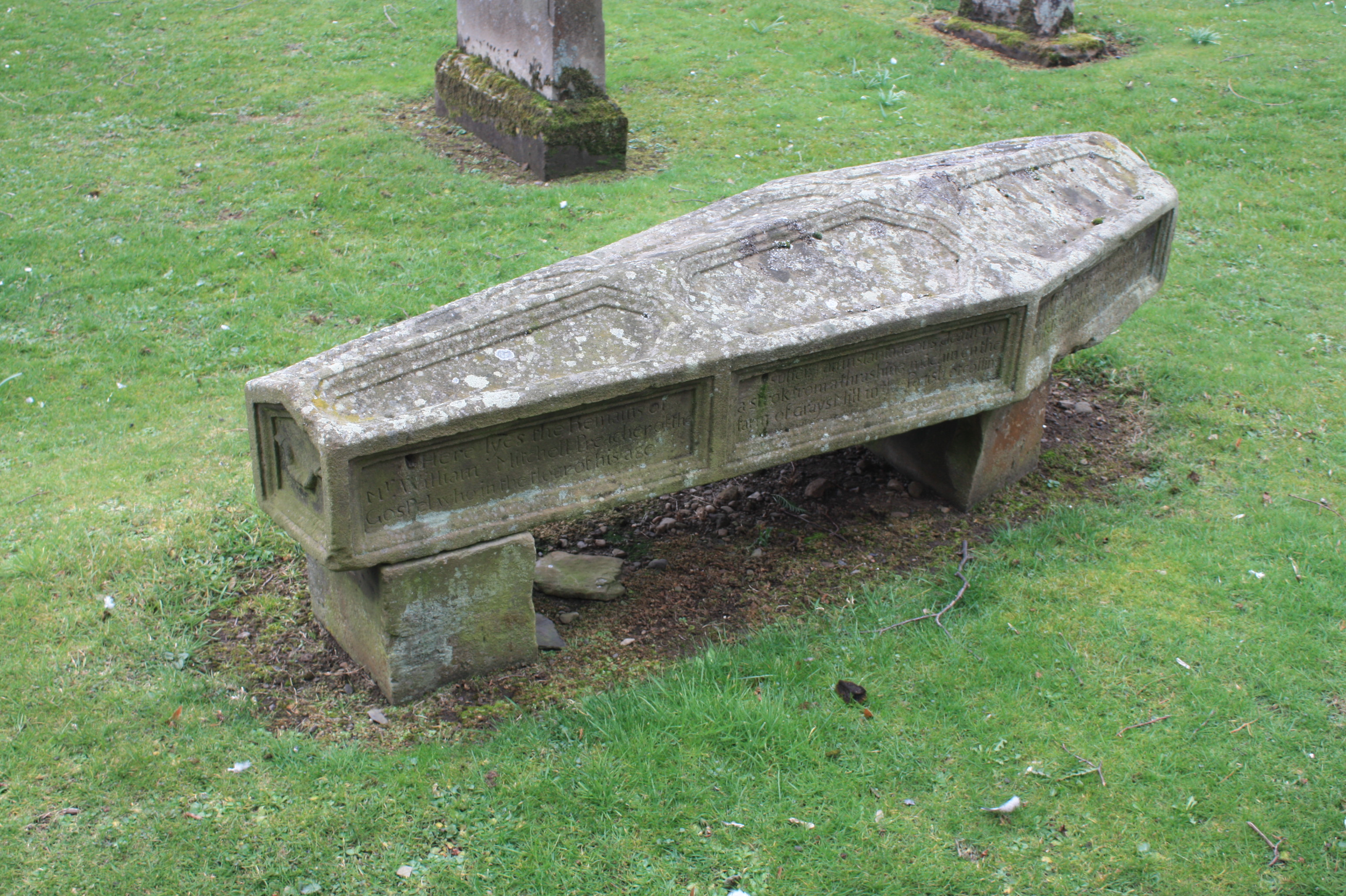
Coffin stone in Ratho churchyard

There is evidence of a pre-Norman, Celtic church on this site, and reference to St Mary's in Ratho date back to 1243. Up until the Reformation, Ratho was part of the Bishopric of St Andrews but had been annexed to Corstorphine Church to the east.

The east aisle is dated 1683. West of the south aisle (1830) half of an ornate 12th-century doorway is still visible. Generally the church has never been grand, but it bears the hallmarks of centuries of evolutionary change. The interior was generally denuded in 1932 including loss of the 18th century gallery. A 13th-century memorial lies in the south porch. One curious feature is the bell, which was rung by an external chain which has carved a groove into the stonework below the bell.

The churchyard is of equal antiquity and interest. Its greatest oddity is a gravestone to John Mitchell who died in 1749 aged 80 years. He was a mason by trade and the gravestone was cut out many years before he died in the form of a panelled coffin. An identical coffin stone (dated 1751) exists in Currie churchyard 5 miles to the south-east. Richard Lauder, the last Lauder laird of Haltoun, was interred in the graveyard on 29 November 1675. Other graves of note are Thomas Wilkie (d.1679), William Anderson (d.1756) and the Rev Andrew Duncan (d.1827) (Moderator of the Church of Scotland in 1824).

The manse is a very fine two storey Georgian villa standing to the east on the opposite side of the main road. It dates from around 1790 and is constructed of whin stone. It faces southwards, away from the road. Its outbuildings have been converted into a separate house now slightly separating it from the church.

A new cemetery of far less character now lies on the NE outskirts of the village, slightly out of sight from the churchyard, just east of the manse.

==== Notable ministers ====
- David Wemyss was translated to Glasgow Cathedral in 1562 as its first Protestant minister.
- William Wilkie from 1753 to 1759, Professor of Natural Philosophy at St Andrews University and known as "Potato Willie" for his poetry
- Very Rev Andrew Duncan Moderator of the General Assembly of the Church of Scotland in 1824

== Transport ==
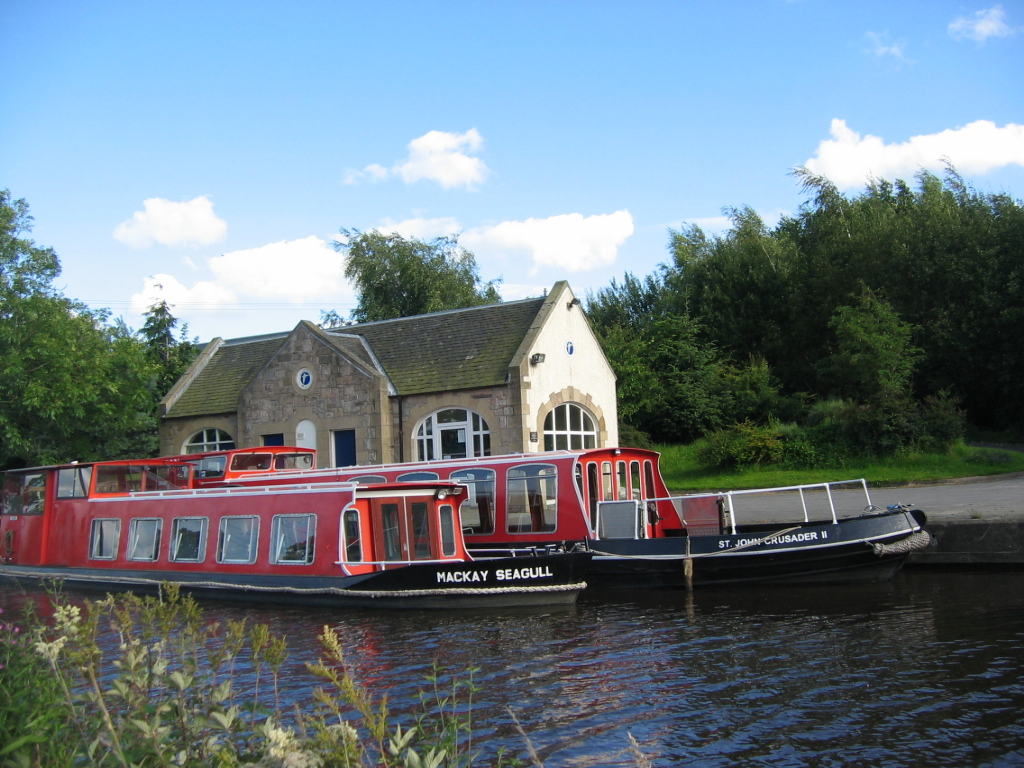
Seagull Trust base at Ratho

Ratho is located close to both the M8 and the M9 motorways. The A8 and A71 run parallel to the north and the south of the village. These are two of the major roads running into Edinburgh. There is a network of paths around Ratho and the surrounding area, and you can also walk or cycle along the canal towpath.

=== Lothian country buses ===
70: Hermiston Park and Ride - Ratho - Ratho Station - Gyle Centre

=== Union Canal ===
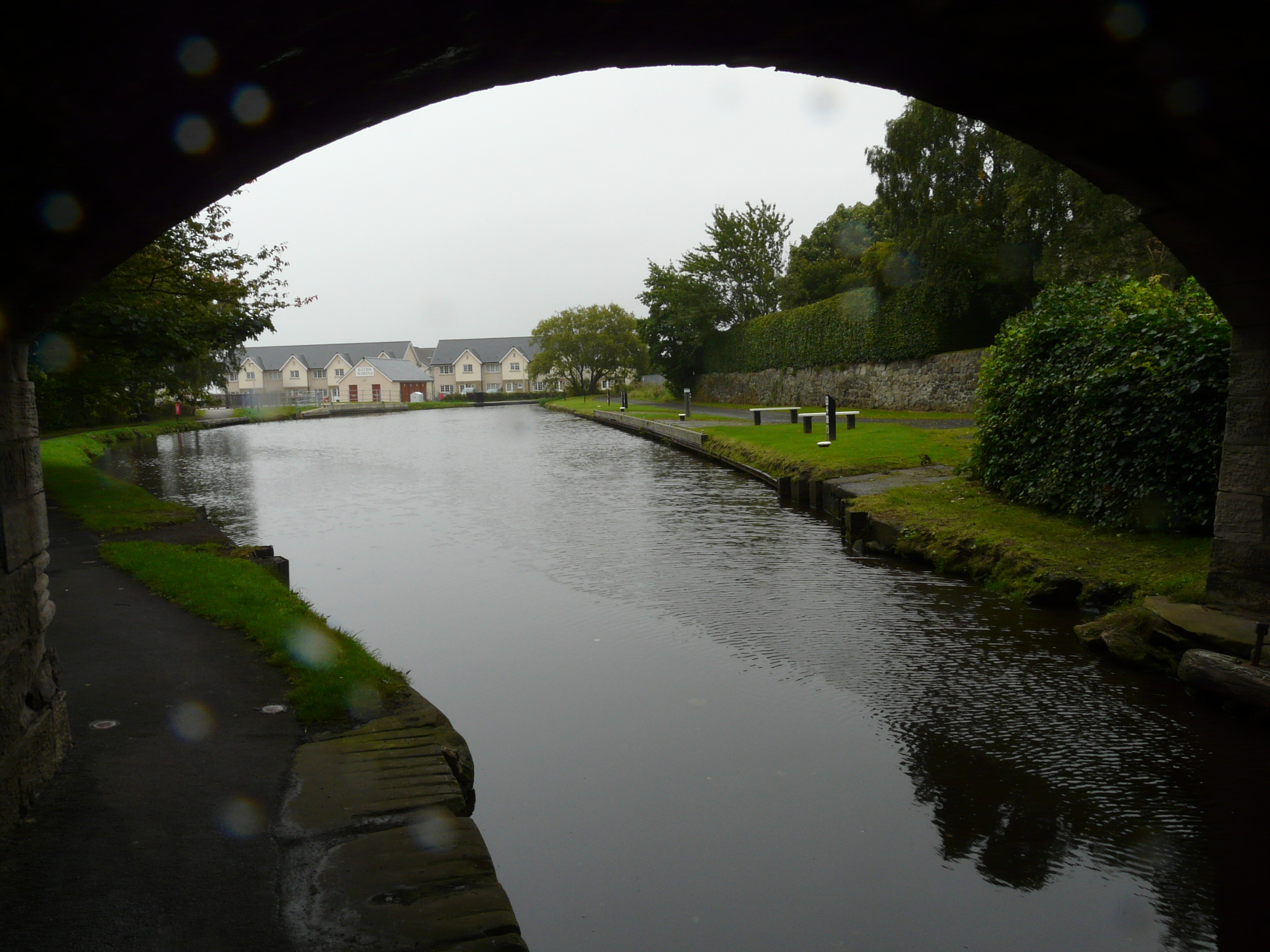
Union Canal at Ratho

The Union Canal was built through the area from 1818 to 1822.

Ratho is the location of Edinburgh Canal Centre, founded in 1989 by the late Ronnie Rusack (May 1948 to 24 November 2020) when he was landlord of the Bridge Inn. In recognition of his voluntary work in support of the Scottish canals, Bridge 15 (which stands alongside the Bridge Inn on the canal) was renamed "Rusack's Bridge" in a ceremony on 2 April 2022.

Seagull Trust Cruises is a boating charity offering free cruises from Ratho to the elderly and disabled people since 1979. It is entirely run by unpaid volunteers. It also boasts the only dry dock on the Union Canal. The dry dock is available to all canal boaters. The Trust also has branches at Falkirk, Kirkintilloch and Inverness. On either side of Rusack's Bridge are a series of artworks relating to the canal's history. Many of these can be used as seating. "Baird Road" commemorates Hugh Baird who designed the canal.

The Union Canal no longer operates as a transport link, but is now used for fishing, magnet fishing and some leisure boating. It has a towpath previously used by the horses which drew canal barges and which is now used as a footpath, the foot paths are popular places for dog walkers, bikers, runners and walkers.

== Notable attractions ==
=== Edinburgh International Climbing Arena ===
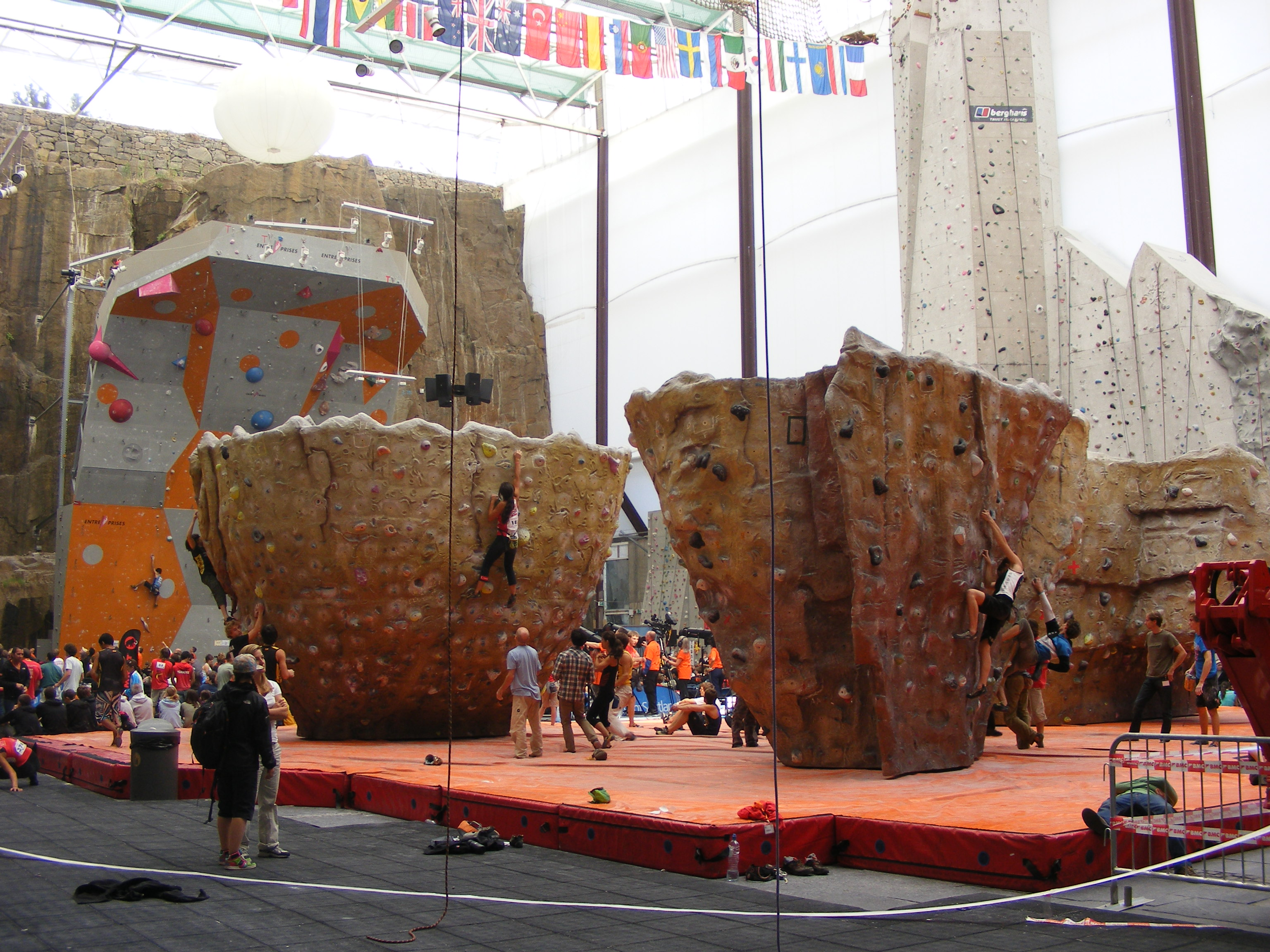
Edinburgh International Climbing Arena from floor level

The arena was the world's biggest indoor climbing arena when it was opened in December 2003.

=== Lin’s Mill ===
West of Ratho stands a small group of mill buildings dating from around 1600. A group of rubble-built cottages sited at right angles to the mill were demolished in the 1960s reducing the size of the group.

Conversion to a house in 1971 by Morris and Steadman greatly reduced its historic significance and it is listed category C.

In the wood above Lin's Mill is the grave of William Lin reputed to be the last man in Scotland to die of the plague (but many similar plague graves exist from that year). The grave is marked by a slab with a crude coat of arms, memento mori and the inscription "Here lyeth the dust of William Lin right heritor of Linsmiln who died in the year of the lord 1645".

The nearby Almond Aqueduct on the Union Canal is also known as the Lin's Mill Aqueduct.

=== Lost Shore Surf Resort ===
In October 2019, construction started on the Lost Shore Surf Resort in Craigpark Quarry in Ratho, the first inland surfing lagoon in Scotland. The resort was opened to the public in spring 2025. The facility is designed to occupy an area of 48,500 square metres, and has a user capacity of up to 100 surfers per hour. The amenities include a surf school, surf shop, and cafe/restaurant as well as accommodation of mixed sizes including bothies, pods and lodges.

=== Local media ===
In addition to city-wide media, Ratho is covered by “Konect Balerno”, part of the family of monthly “Konect” magazines published in West Lothian and Edinburgh West, which is delivered to households in Ratho as well as Balerno, Currie, Juniper Green, and Baberton Mains.

== Notable residents ==
- James Anderson of Hermiston
- Walter Leonard Bell
- Very Rev Andrew Duncan, Moderator of the General Assembly of the Church of Scotland 1824
- James Duncan of Ratho, tailor to Anne of Denmark.
- Sir John Gibson
- Thomas Grainger
- Alexander Lauder
- Alexander Lauder of Blyth
- John Maitland, 5th Earl of Lauderdale
- James Maitland, 8th Earl of Lauderdale
- William Serle
- William Grant Stevenson, sculptor
- David Watson Stevenson, sculptor
- Ebenezer James MacRae, architect
- Richard Turner (geologist)
- William Wilkie, poet
