= Richard Turner (Cambridge University cricketer) =

English cricketer (1932–2023)

Richard Vinson Turner (6 April 1932 – 2023) was an English cricketer who played ten first-class games for Cambridge University as a batsman in the 1950s. He also appeared for Devon in the Minor Counties Championship.

== Biography ==
Richard Vinson Turner was born in Torquay, Devon, England, on 6 April 1932.

By some distance Turner's highest score — he never otherwise even reached 30 — was the 113 not out he struck against Marylebone Cricket Club (MCC) at Fenner's in June 1953; he shared in an unbroken stand of 196 for the fourth wicket with Raman Subba Row. As of 2007 this remains Cambridge's highest partnership for that wicket against MCC.

Turner died in 2023.
