= Richard Turner (writer) =

Richard Turner (1753 – 22 August 1788) was an English writer.

== Biography ==
Turner was born in 1753, was the second son of Richard Turner, by his wife Sarah, only sister of James Greene, barrister-at-law. He matriculated from Magdalen Hall, Oxford, on 9 February 1773. In 1778 he published "An Heretical History, collected from the original authors," London, 8vo, a compilation setting forth the origin and doctrines of the various heretical sects of the early Christian world. This was followed in 1780 by "A New and Easy Introduction to Universal Geography" (London, 12mo), issued in the form of a series of letters. The work, which was of an elementary character, reached a thirteenth edition in 1808. Encouraged by the success of this sketch, he brought out three years later "An Easy Introduction to the Arts and Sciences" (London, 1783, 12mo), which was equally popular, and, with various additions and alterations, continued a standard school textbook for some time, reaching a fourteenth edition in 1811. Turner died without issue at Bath on 22 August 1788. He married the widow of Colonel Farrer. He was also the brother of the potter Thomas Turner

Besides the works mentioned, he was the author of: 1. "A View of the Earth as it was known to the Ancients," London, 1779, 8vo. 2. "An Epitome of Universal History," London, 1787, 12mo.
