= Richard Turner (musician) =

Jazz trumpeter

Richard Turner was a jazz trumpeter who died in 2011 aged 27 of a ruptured aortic aneurysm while swimming. He led the contemporary jazz quartet Round Trip and played with indie-pop band Friendly Fires. He was a graduate of the Royal Academy of Music, Leeds College of Music, and Allerton Grange School. A documentary film about his life Richard Turner: A Life in Music was released in 2019. The Richard Turner Jazz Fund awards £1,000 to a jazz student towards a specific area of help with their studies.
