= Richard Turner (rector) =

Richard Turner (1724? – 12 April 1791) was an English divine and author.

== Biography ==
Turner was born in 1723 or 1724, was the son of Thomas Turner of Great Webly, Worcestershire. He matriculated from Magdalen Hall, Oxford, on 14 July 1748. He became chaplain to the Countess Dowager of Wigton, and on 11 June 1754 was instituted vicar of Elmley Castle in Worcestershire. On 19 June of the same year he was appointed rector of Little Comberton. In 1785 he received the honorary degree of LL.D. from Glasgow University. He died on 12 April 1791 and was buried at Norton-juxta-Kempsey in Worcestershire. He married Sarah, only sister of James Greene, a barrister, of Burford, Shropshire. She died in 1801. By her he had three sons—Thomas and Richard, who are separately noticed, and Edward, a general in the Indian Army—and two daughters.

== Works ==
Turner was author of:

- "The Young Gauger's best Instructor," London, 1762, 8vo.
- "A View of the Earth: a short but comprehensive System of Modern Geography," London, 1762, 8vo.
- "Plain [sic] Trigonometry rendered easy and familiar by Calculations in Arithmetic only," London, 1765, fol.; new ed. 1778.
- "View of the Heavens, being a System of Modern Astronomy," London, 1783, fol.
- "The Young Geometrician's Companion,’ London, 1787, 12mo. 6. ‘An Account of a System of Education," London, 1791, 8vo.

Turner's portrait, painted by Albert, was engraved by Stainier in 1787.
