= Richard Turner (geologist) =

Scottish physician, archaeologist and geologist

Dr Richard Turner MD FRSE OBE (1856 - April 1940) was a Scottish physician, archaeologist and geologist.

== Life ==
He was born in Ratho, west of Edinburgh, in 1856, the son of John Turner, a farmer.

He studied medicine at the University of Edinburgh graduating with an MB ChB in 1880. He practiced as a general practitioner in York.

In the First World War he served the military hospitals in the York area. He received a military OBE in 1919. He was President of the Yorkshire branch of the British Medical Association.

He retired to Peebles in 1921 and began to indulge his geological interests. He contributed many samples to the Royal Museum of Scotland in Edinburgh and reorganised and catalogued the entire geological collection. He undertook archaeological excavations at Romanno and Dunsyre in 1928. He was made a Burgess of Peebles in 1923.

He was elected a Fellow of the Royal Society of Edinburgh in 1924. His proposers were John Horne, David Balsillie, Sir John Smith Flett and Thomas James Jehu.

He died in Edinburgh on 9 April 1940.
