= Turner (potters) =

Family of English potters, active from the mid-18th to the early 19th century

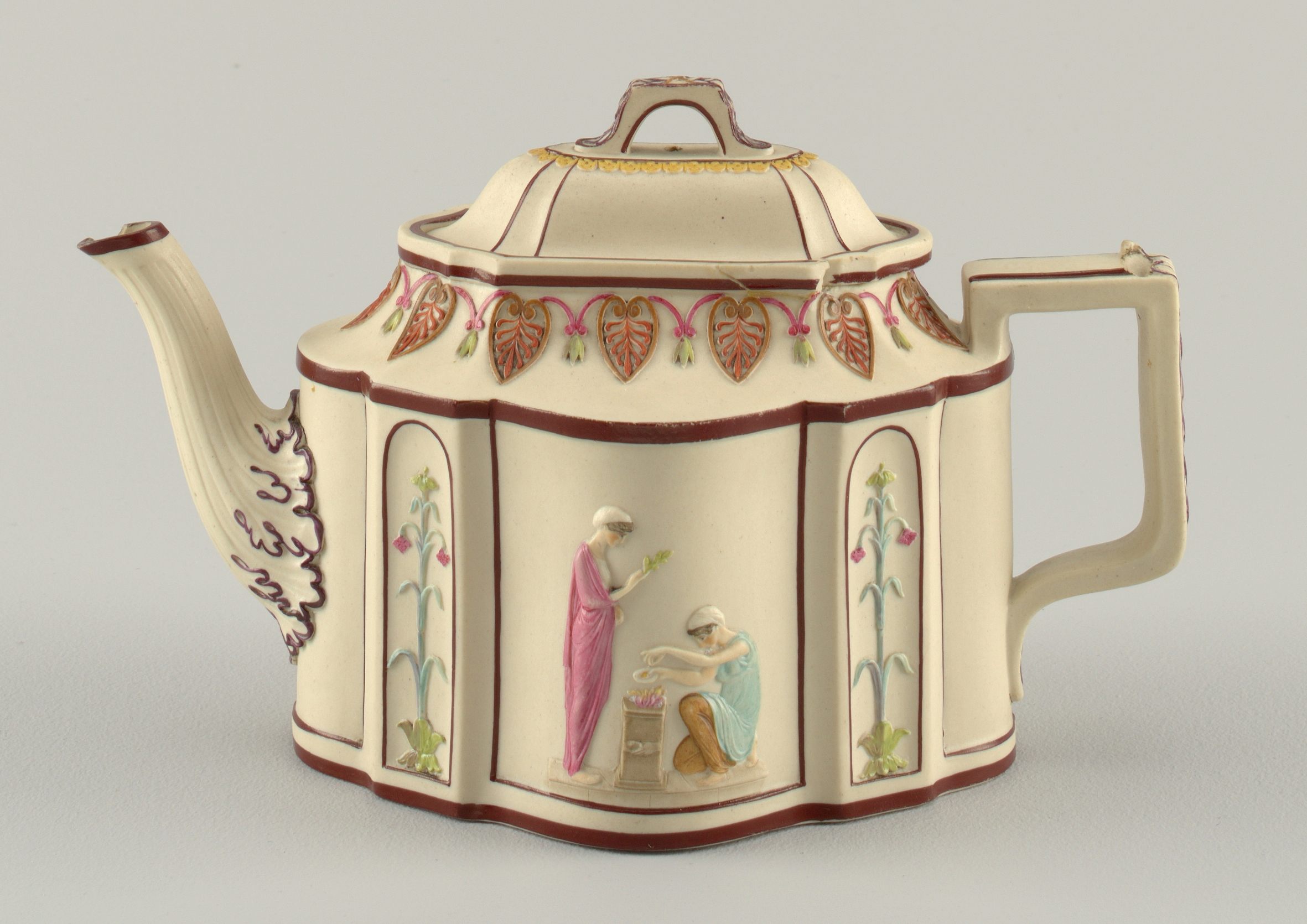
Teapot, c. 1785, stoneware with enamel decoration.

The Turner family of potters was active in Staffordshire, England 1756-1829. Their manufactures have been compared favourably with, and sometimes confused with, those of Josiah Wedgwood and Sons. Josiah Wedgwood was both a friend and a commercial rival of John Turner the elder, the first notable potter in the family.

The Turner factory, like Wedgwood, mostly made fine earthenwares and stonewares but, briefly and not very successfully, made hard-paste porcelain themselves. John Turner the Elder was also an original partner in the New Hall porcelain factory, though not associated with the factory for long. Many of the most interesting wares from the Turner factory are unglazed, in caneware, jasperware and basalt ware. Geoffrey Godden uses the term "Turner stoneware" for "a refined earthenware being a cross between caneware and stoneware" (bearing in mind that many classify caneware as stoneware). The Turner factory was the leading and best maker, but many others also made this body, mainly for items like tankards and jugs, decorated with scenes in relief. The family operated the first factory, at Lane End, now part of Longton, Staffordshire, from the early 1760s (or possibly c. 1759) to 1806, when John Junior and William went bankrupt, although William Turner, son of John, continued potting until 1829, and members of the family worked for other factories.

== Family ==
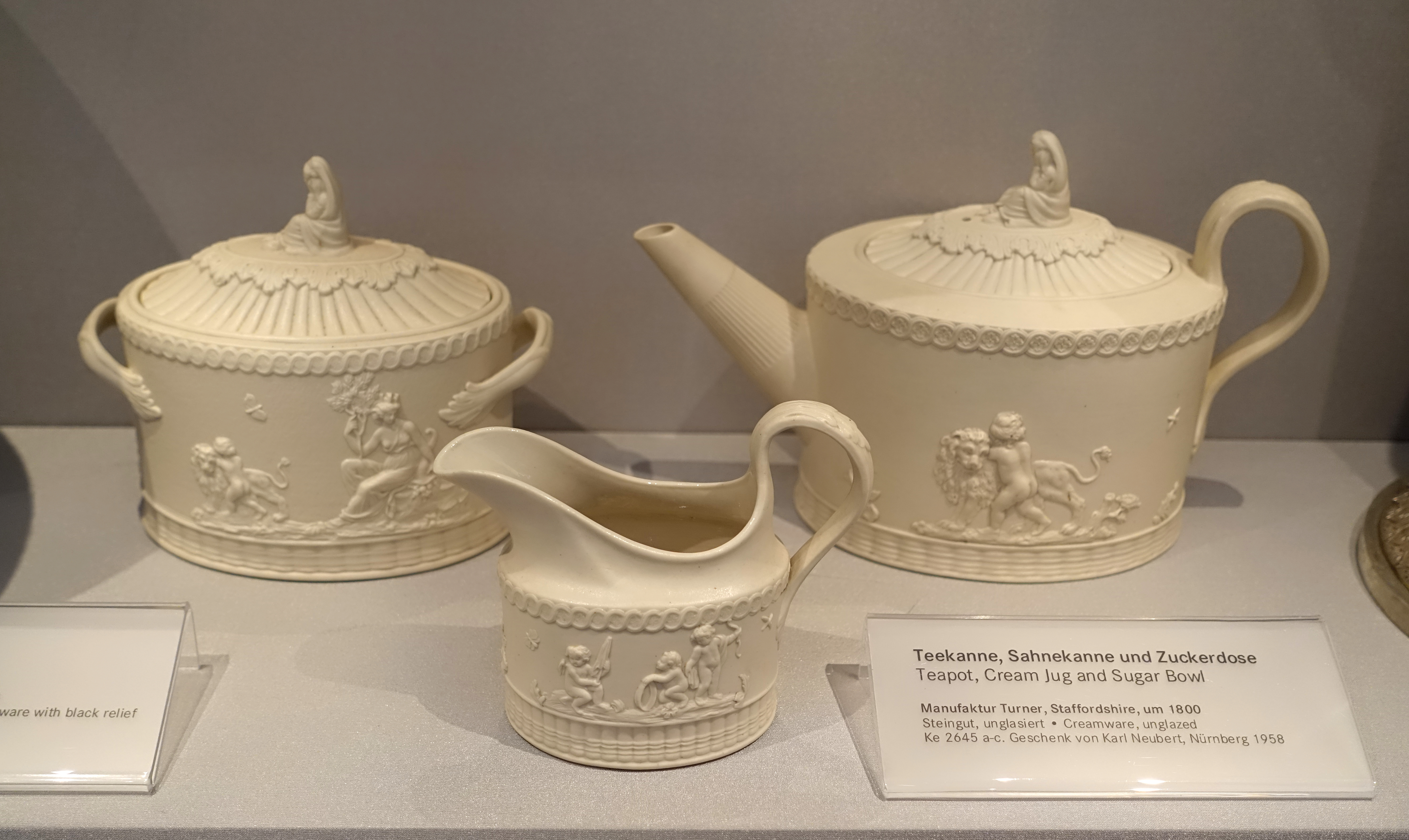
Teapot, cream jug, and sugar bowl, Turner factory, Staffordshire, c. 1800, unglazed "Turner stoneware"

John Turner the elder (christened 7 June 1737, St Nicholas Church, Newport, Shropshire – 24 December 1787) was apprenticed in 1753 to the Staffordshire potter Daniel Bird. By 1756, he was established in a partnership with R. Banks, at Stoke-on-Trent, at a factory which has since been absorbed into the Spode group. In 1759 or 1762, he relocated to Lane End (now part of Longton). Nothing is known about his education; but he knew sufficient French to write his formulations in that language, perhaps as a defence against industrial espionage. The earliest piece reliably attributed to him is a 1762 teapot. In 1775, he installed a Newcomen engine at his pottery. In 1780, he was one of the founders of the New Hall China Manufactory at Stoke.

About 1780, he discovered a vein of fine clay (called "peacock marl") at Dock Green or Green Dock, Edensor, Derbyshire, which he used to make a wide variety of wares of a "cane" colour. He also made blue glazed pottery similar to Japanese porcelain. He was appointed potter to the Prince of Wales in 1784, and some of his wares are marked with the Prince of Wales's feathers.

John the elder married Ann Emery on 15 October 1759. They had three sons and three daughters; among whom were William (1762 – 5 July 1835) and John the younger; he made them partners in his firm about 1780, and they continued it after his death.

On 19 January 1800, the brothers were granted a patent for the manufacture of a new kind of stoneware, the "forerunner of ironstone china" which has been called "Turner's patent". Around 1805 the patent rights were sold to Spode, who perfected it and renamed it Stone China.

William had been in Paris during the French Revolution, and arrested, and escaped with his life only by the intervention of the British ambassador, Earl Stafford. In 1803, William was a Major in the Longton volunteers.

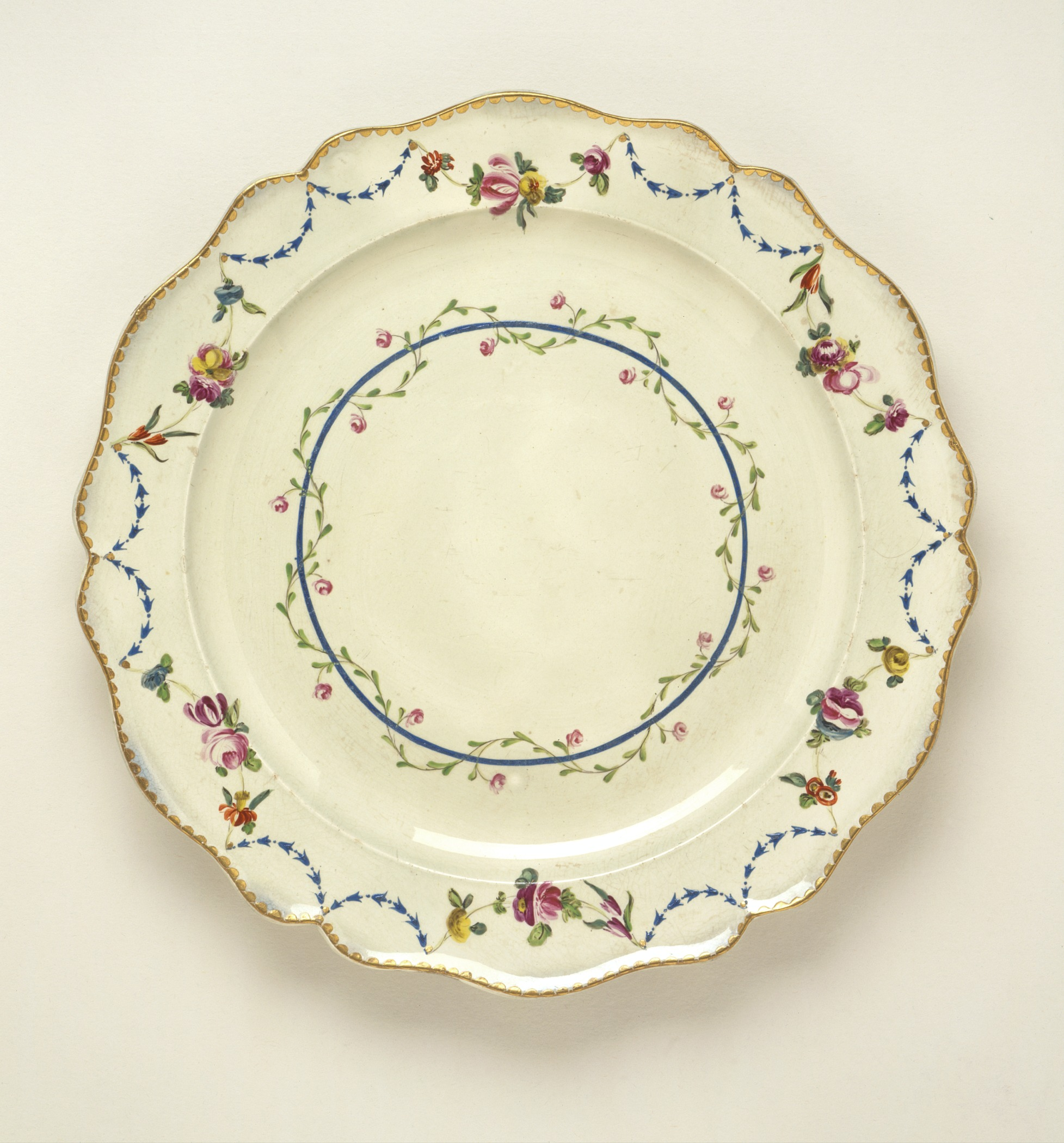
Pearlware plate, c. 1780

In money trouble, allegedly in part because of the turmoil caused by the French revolutionary and Napoleonic Wars, the brothers in 1803 took in partners and formed Turner & Co. By December 1804 there was a notice in the Staffordshire Advertiser announcing the cessation of trading. By 1806 both brothers were individually declared bankrupt.

Son William, continued potting apparently working for several potters until he returned to the original factory 1824-1829 to produce again in the Turner name. His marriage to Elizabeth Wright was 9 November 1799. His bust, by George Ray, is in Stoke-on-Trent City Museum.

Son John married Mary Hyde on 26 November 1803 and the closure of the business notice of 1804 stated that he had already left the partnership. So by Dec 1804 he was already working as managing potter for Mintons. By 1815 he left Minton and the family moved to Brewood. Although leased Brewood Hall was the family home of his mother.

The Brewood churchyard is the final resting place for both father and son as well as numerous other Turner family members.

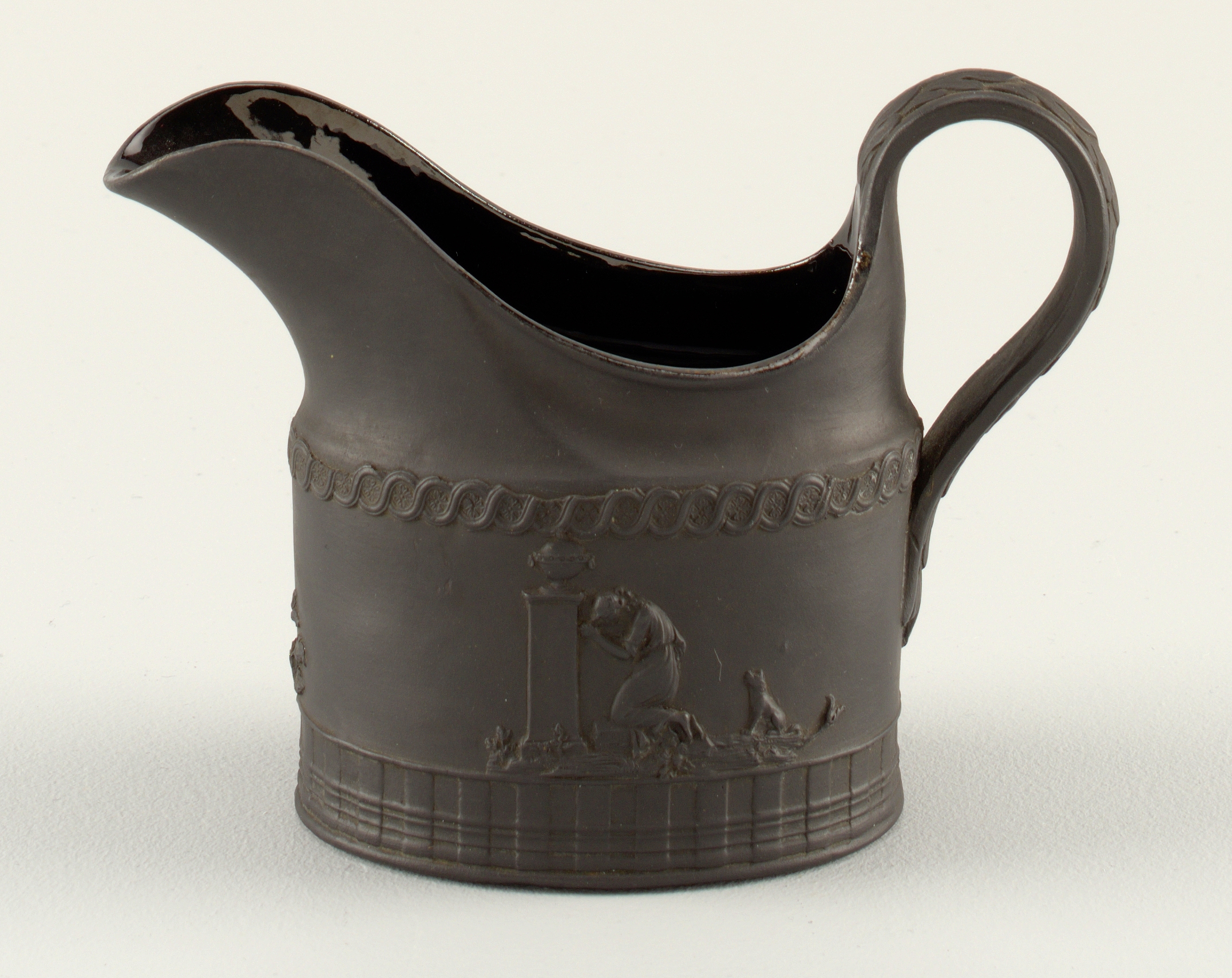
Small elliptical jug in black basalt ware (glazed inside), with sprigged Neoclassical reliefs.

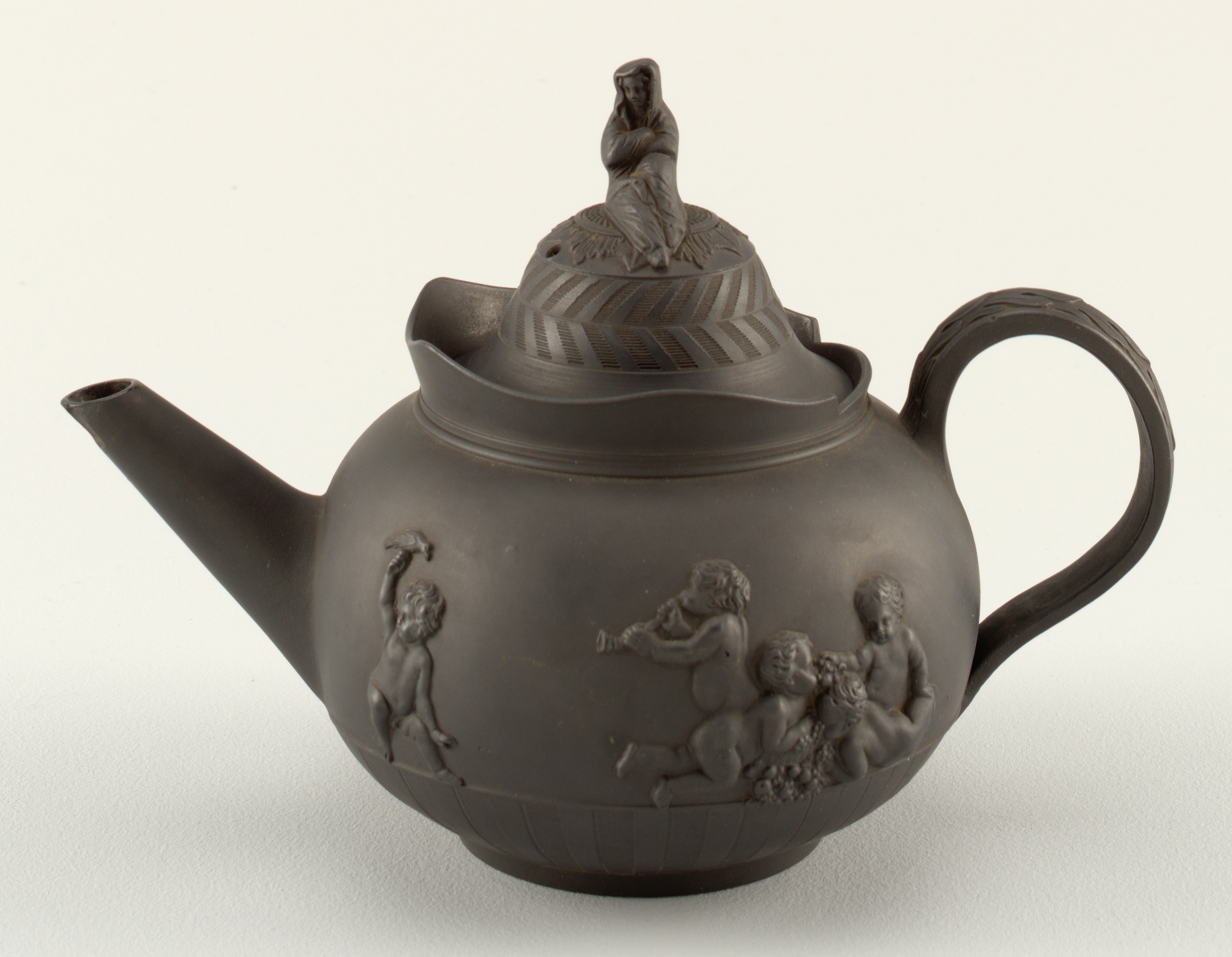
Black basalt (unglazed stoneware) teapot, c. 1780

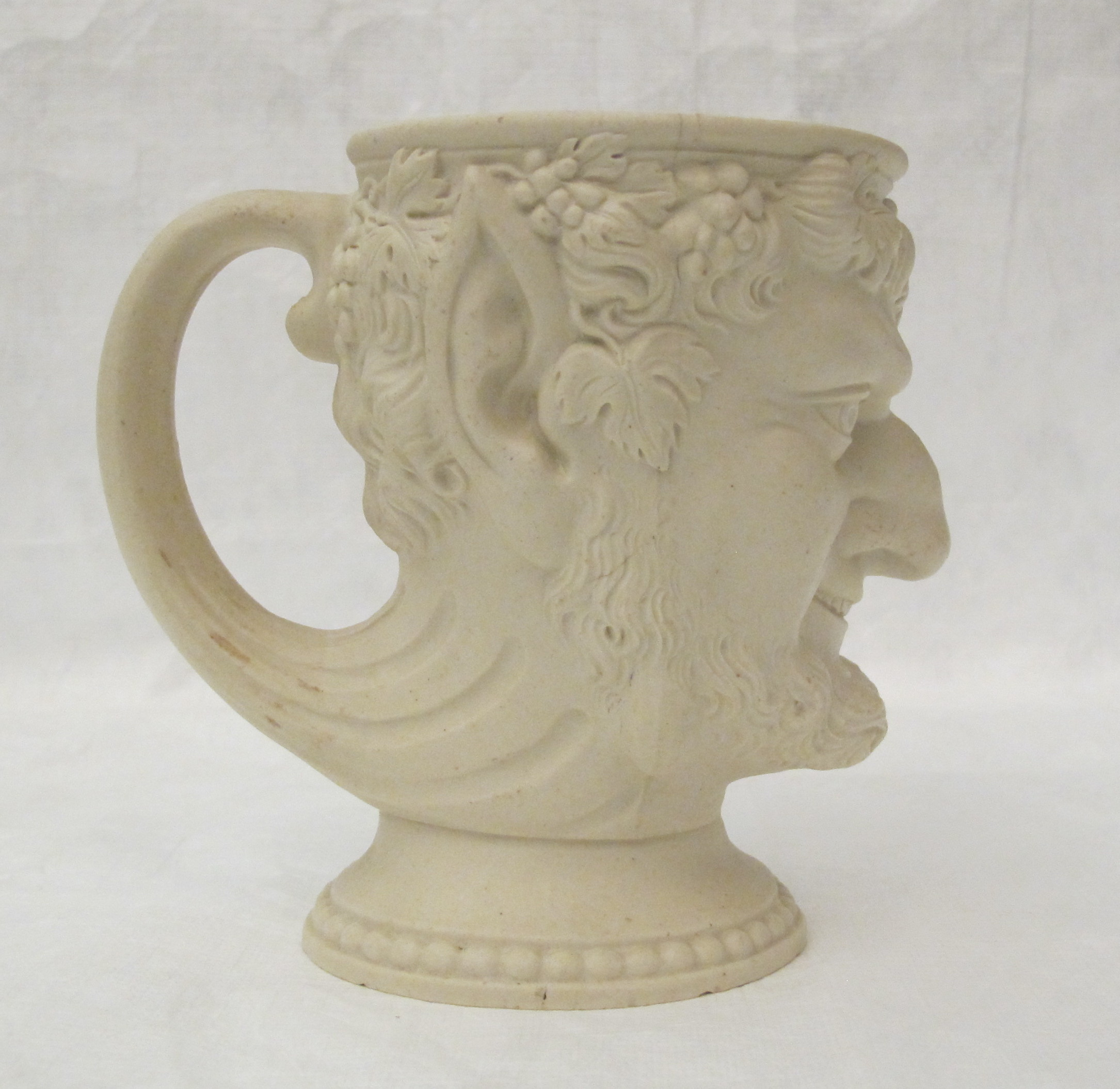
Mug moulded as satyr's head, caneware (?)

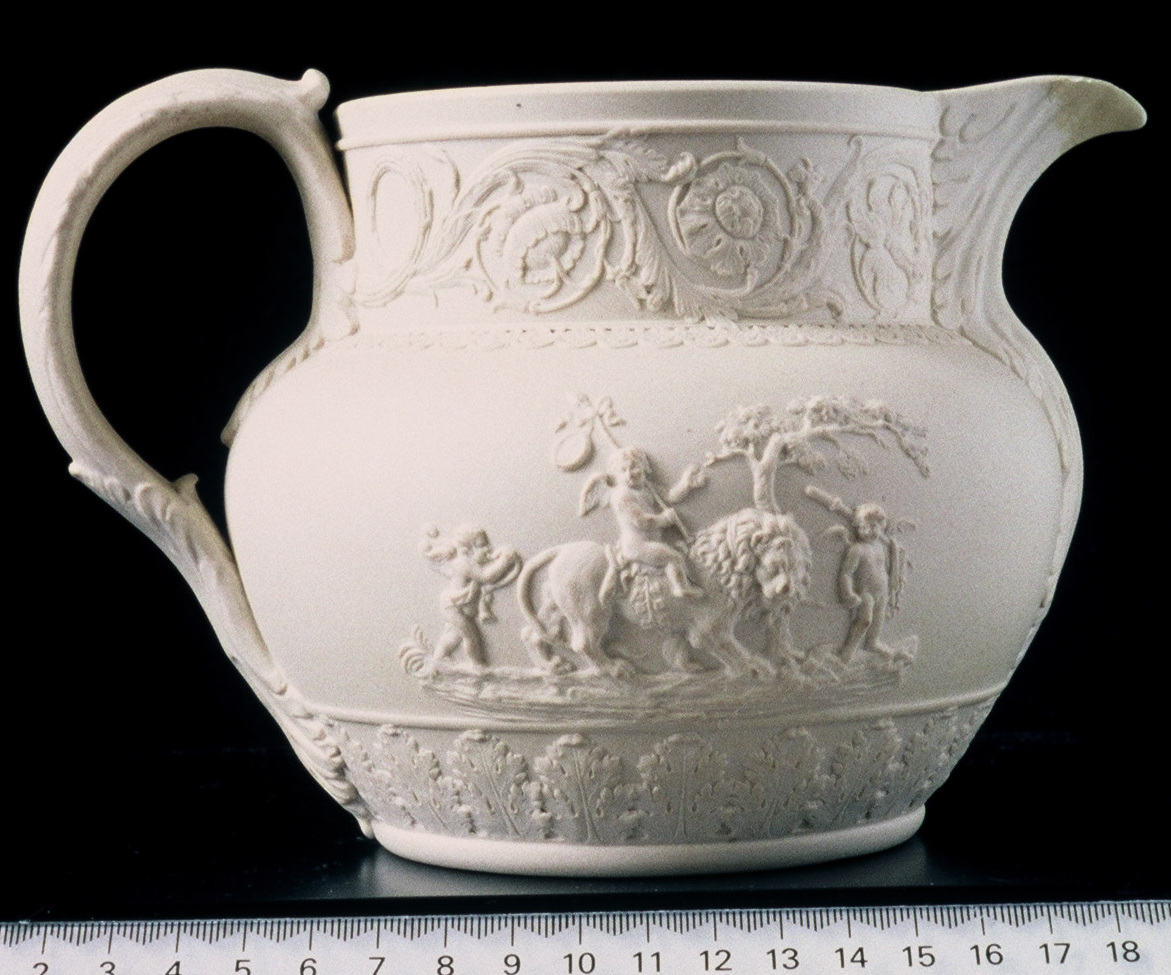
Small jug, only glazed inside, c. 1790
