= J. W. Pankhurst & Co. =

British manufacturer of stone china and ironstone pottery

- Company type: Private company
- Industry: Pottery
- Predecessor: Ridgway Potteries
- Founded: 1850
- Founder: J. W. Pankhurst
- Defunct: 1882
- Fate: Bankrupt
- Successor: Johnson Brothers
- Headquarters: Hanley, Staffordshire, United Kingdom
- Area served: England
- Products: White granite ware pottery

J. W. Pankhurst was a British manufacturer of stone china and ironstone pottery, located in Hanley, Stoke-on-Trent, Staffordshire, England.

== History ==
Pankhurst took over the pottery of William Ridgway of the Ridgway Potteries family, who had introduced white granite ware.

Between 1850 and 1851, the pottery operated as "J. W. Pankhurst" until J. Dimmock joined as a partner in 1852, at which point "& Co." was added.

The company had operations from Charles Street and Old Hall Street in Hanley from 1850 to 1882 until its bankruptcy and subsequent sale to Johnson Bros.
