= Flow blue =

Style of white earthenware

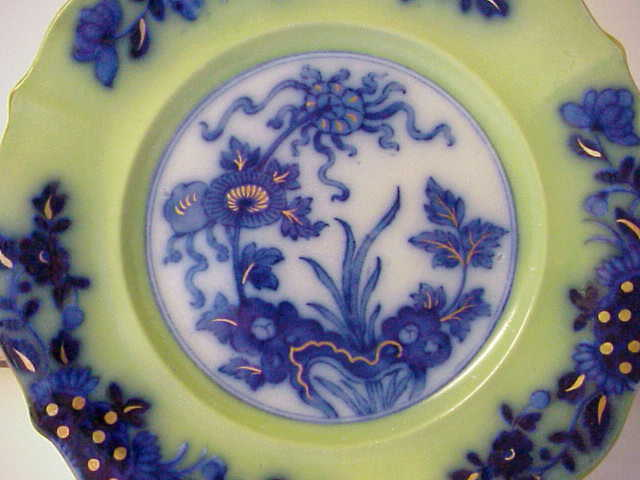
Detail of a gilded, polychrome flow blue plate manufactured by Samuel Alcock, Staffordshire, "Hyson" pattern, c. 1843.

Flow blue (occasionally 'flown blue') is a style of white earthenware, sometimes porcelain, that originated in the Regency era, sometime in the 1820s, among the Staffordshire potters of England. The name is derived from the blue glaze that blurred or "flowed" during the firing process.

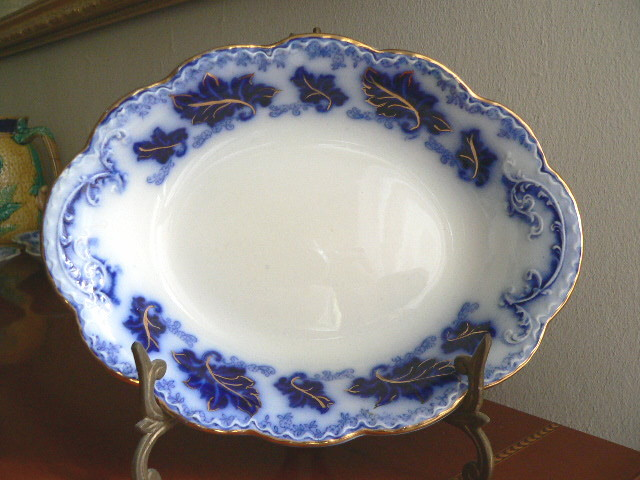
Flow blue vegetable server in the "Normandy" pattern produced by Staffordshire potter Johnson Brothers c. 1890

Most flow blue ware is a kind of transferware, where the decorative patterns were applied with a paper stencil to often white-glazed blanks, or standard pottery shapes, though some wares were hand painted. The stencils burned away in the kiln. The blue glazes used in flow blue range from gray-blue to sometimes greenish blue, to an inky blue; however the most desirable and sought-after shade is a vivid cobalt blue. Mulberry is another form of flow blue, where the glaze is more purple in hue.
