= Homemaker tableware =

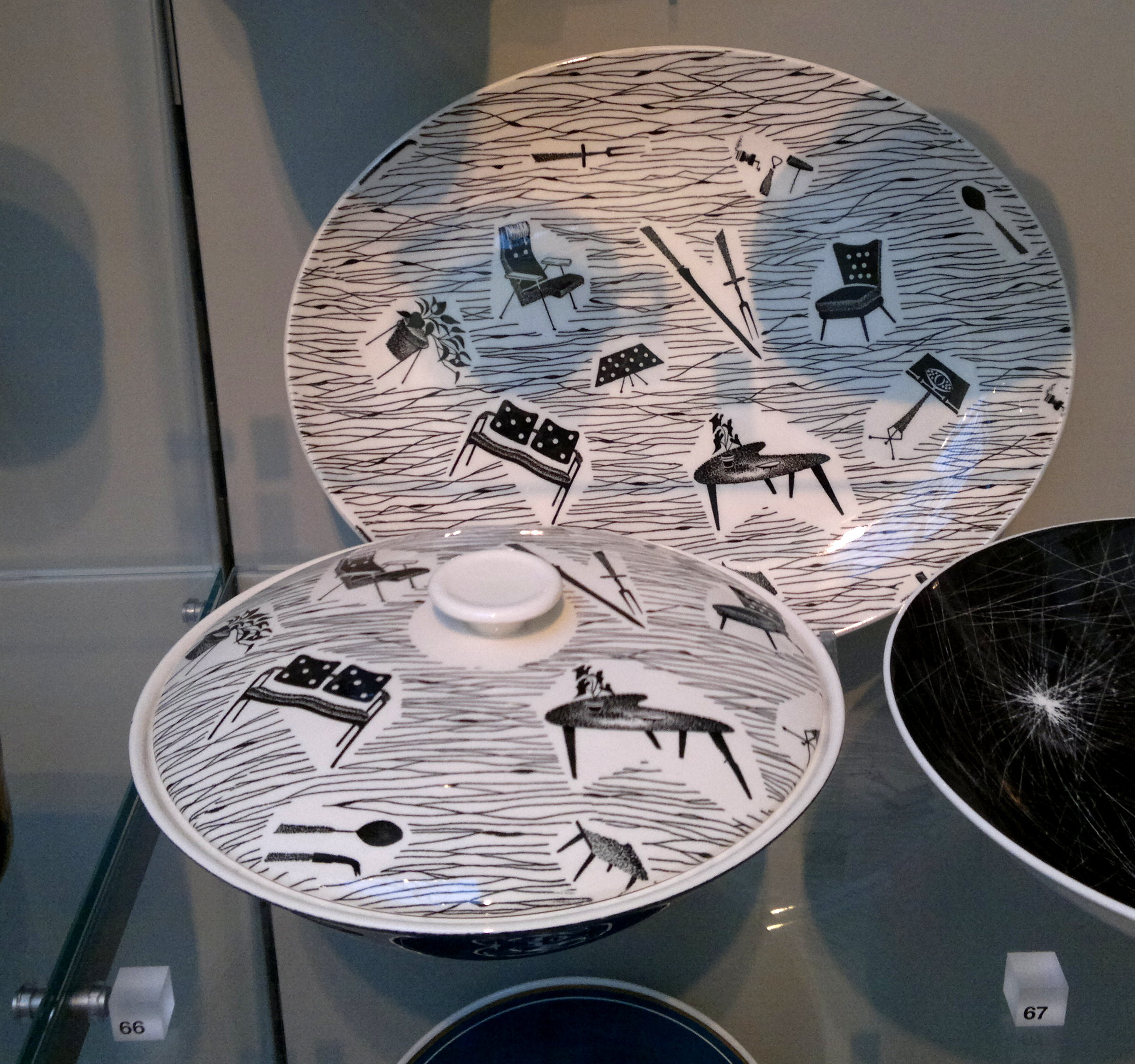
Homemaker tureen and plate in the Victoria & Albert Museum.

Homemaker was a pattern of mass-produced earthenware tableware that was very popular in the United Kingdom in the 1950s and 60s. The pattern was designed by Enid Seeney (2 June 1931 – 8 April 2011), manufactured by Ridgway Potteries of Stoke-on-Trent between 1957 and 1970, and sold exclusively through Woolworth's stores.

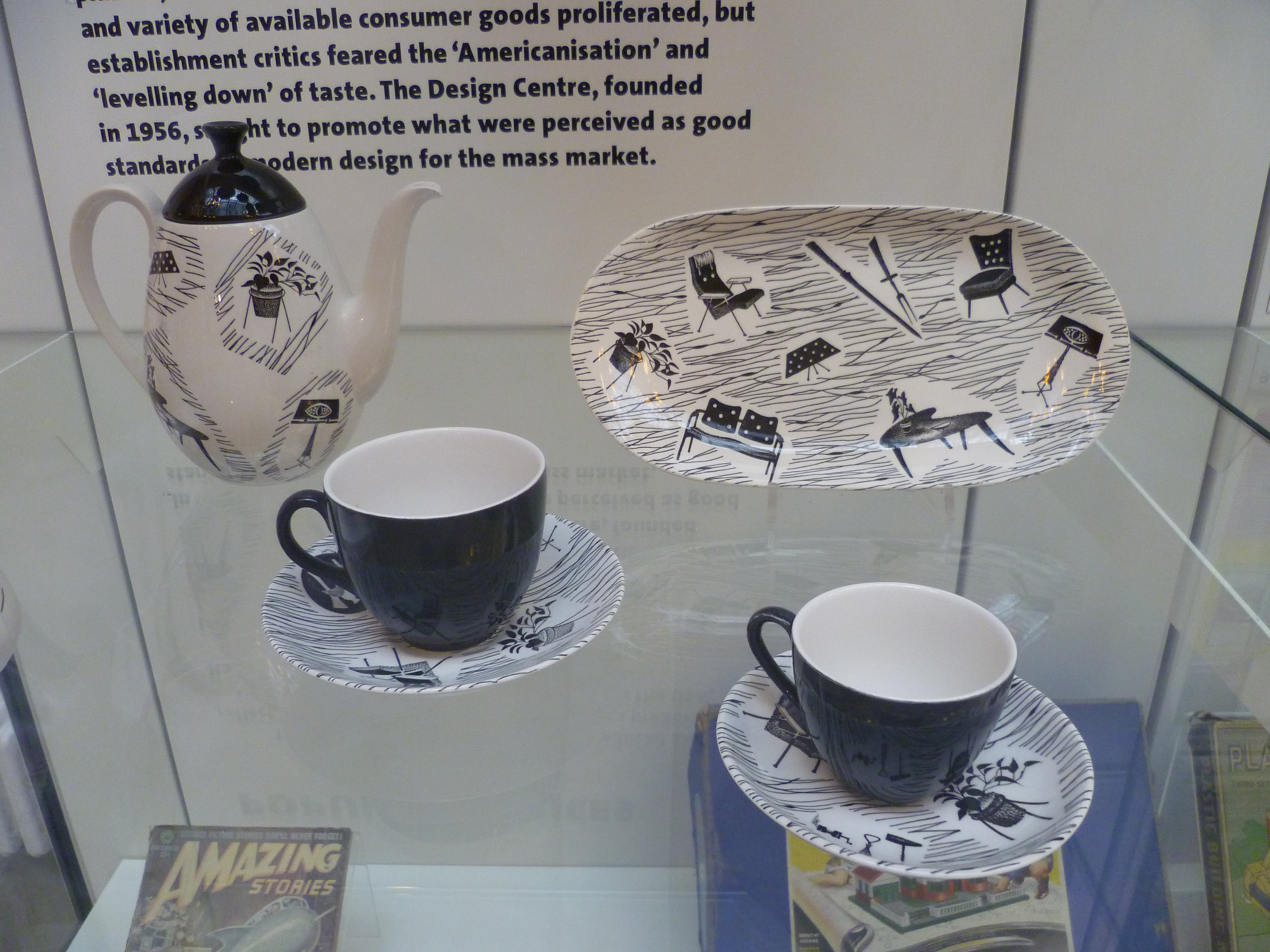
Homemaker teaset in the Victoria & Albert Museum.

The pattern was a distinctive black on white featuring illustrations of the latest home furnishings and utensils against a background of irregular black lines. Items illustrated included a boomerang or kidney shaped table, a Robin Day armchair, a Gordon Russell type sideboard, plant holders on legs, tripod lights and lamp shades, and a two seat Sigvard Bernadotte style sofa. Some very curved elements, such as teacups and lids, were plain black.

== Production ==
Tom Arnold gave Enid Seeney a brief to create a modern all-over pattern suitable for production using the Murray Curvex printing machine. The first prototype was a single plate displayed on the Ridgway stand at the 1956 Blackpool trade fair where it attracted little interest. Seeney's original concept was for a high-end porcelain set, with yellow holloware, and had her team create a group of such items, which were displayed in the Ridgway design studio. This prototype coffee set was then noticed by Ted Smith a buyer from Woolworths who placed an order in 1957 for tea sets to be sold in five London stores. Seeney left Ridgway soon after and did not know that the range was being sold throughout Britain until she later spotted it for sale in a branch of Woolworths in Plymouth. The Homemaker range was first produced using the Metro shape created by Ridgway design director Tom Arnold (died 2002) and later on the new Cadenza shape. Homemaker was earthenware, transfer printed with a glaze applied on top, which enabled it to be produced relatively cheaply and to appeal to a mass market. Production of the blank ware was out-sourced to at least one other Staffordshire factory over its life, but pieces were always printed at Ridgway, and marked with one of a range of Ridgway backstamps. In 1959, the American company Homer-Laughlin made unlicensed copies of the design.

== Collecting ==
Because Homemaker was produced in very large quantities over a long period of time, few pieces are rare. The range is, however, highly collectable. A few pieces are scarce and have higher values, such as the Bon Bon Dish and the Cadenza Teapot which may be the rarest item in the range. Items in red on white are also known, and many of the known examples have been sourced in Australia.
