= Johnson Brothers =

Defunct British tableware manufacturers

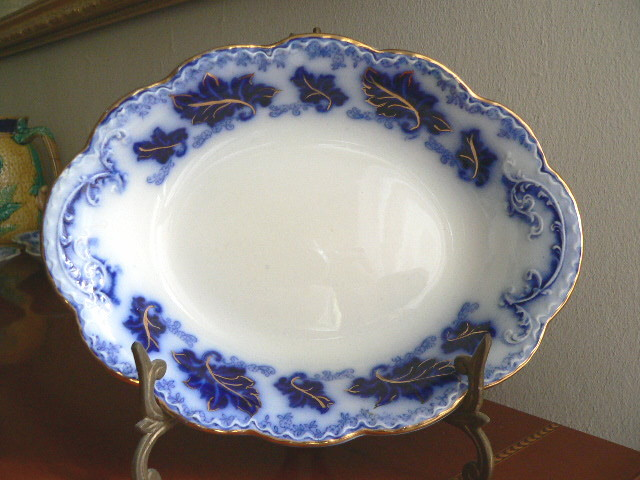
Serving plate with flow blue transfer printing, c. 1890

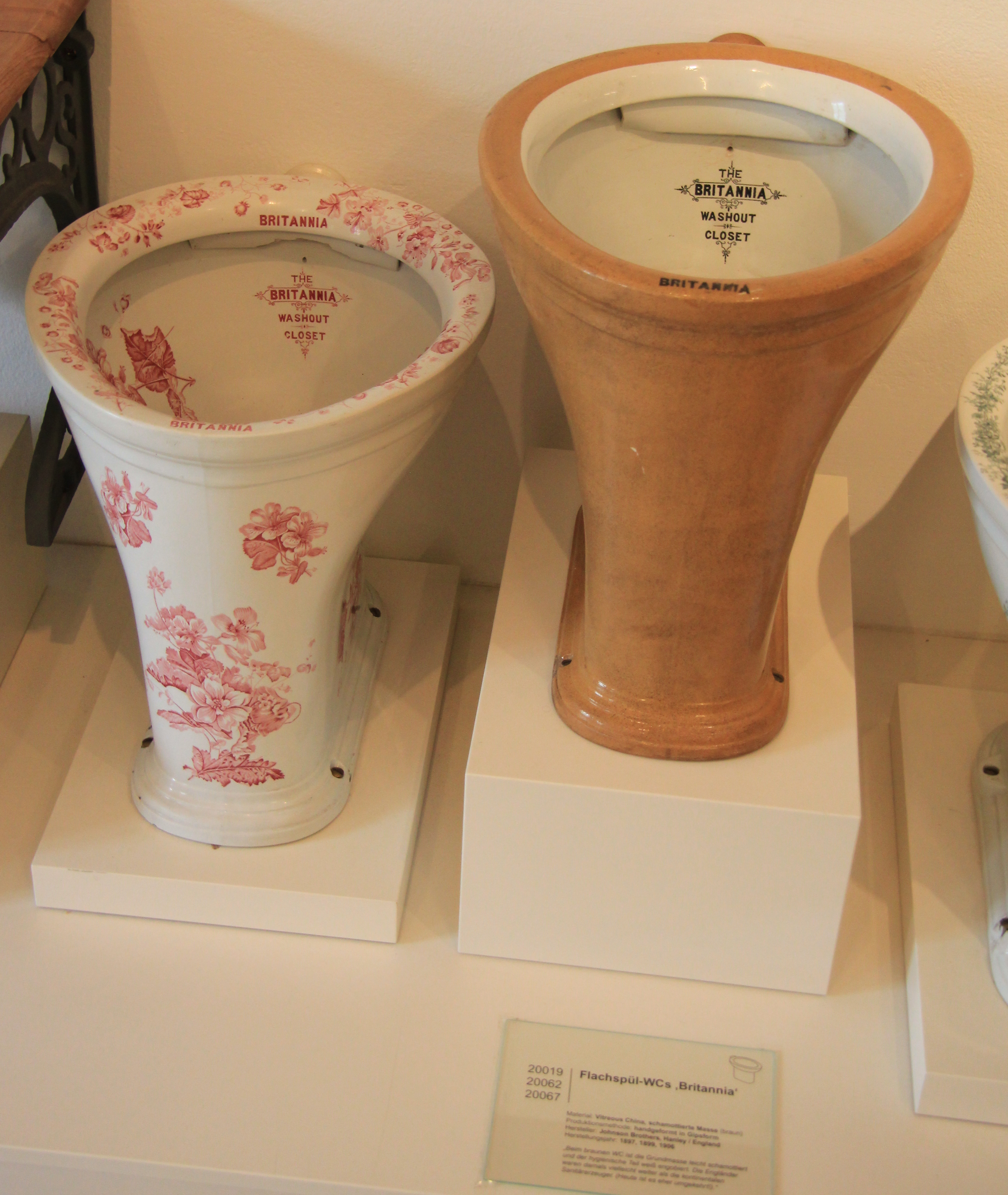
Two versions of the "Britannia" lavatory bowl, 1890s - 1905

Johnson Brothers was a British tableware manufacturer and exporter that was noted for its early introduction of "semi-porcelain" tableware. It was among the most successful Staffordshire potteries which produced tableware, much of it exported to the United States, from the 1890s through to the 1960s. They were also important manufacturers of large bathroom ceramics. Some of its designs, such as "Eternal Beau", "Dawn", "Old Britain Castles" and "Historic America", achieved widespread popularity and are still collected today. The company's success was due in part to its ability to identify and follow trends that appealed to its customers in the United States, and in part to the high quality of its designs, produced by skilled artists.

Founded in 1883, from 1968 to 2015 it operated as a part of the Wedgwood Group. However, after the Wedgwood Group was acquired by Fiskars in 2015, the production of Johnson Brothers was discontinued.

== Origins (1883–1888) ==
The company's name derives from the names of the company's founders. The four original "Johnson Brothers" were Alfred, Frederick, Henry and Robert. Their father married the daughter of a master potter, James Meakin. In 1883, Alfred and Frederick Johnson began production at a defunct pottery, known as the Charles Street Works, that they had purchased at a bankruptcy sale in Hanley, Stoke-on-Trent. At first, they specialised in the manufacture of durable earthenware, which they called "White Granite". The success of this venture led to rapid expansion. In 1888, the Rev. Henry Johnson joined them, followed ten years later by a fourth brother, Robert Johnson.

== Early expansion (1888–1900) ==
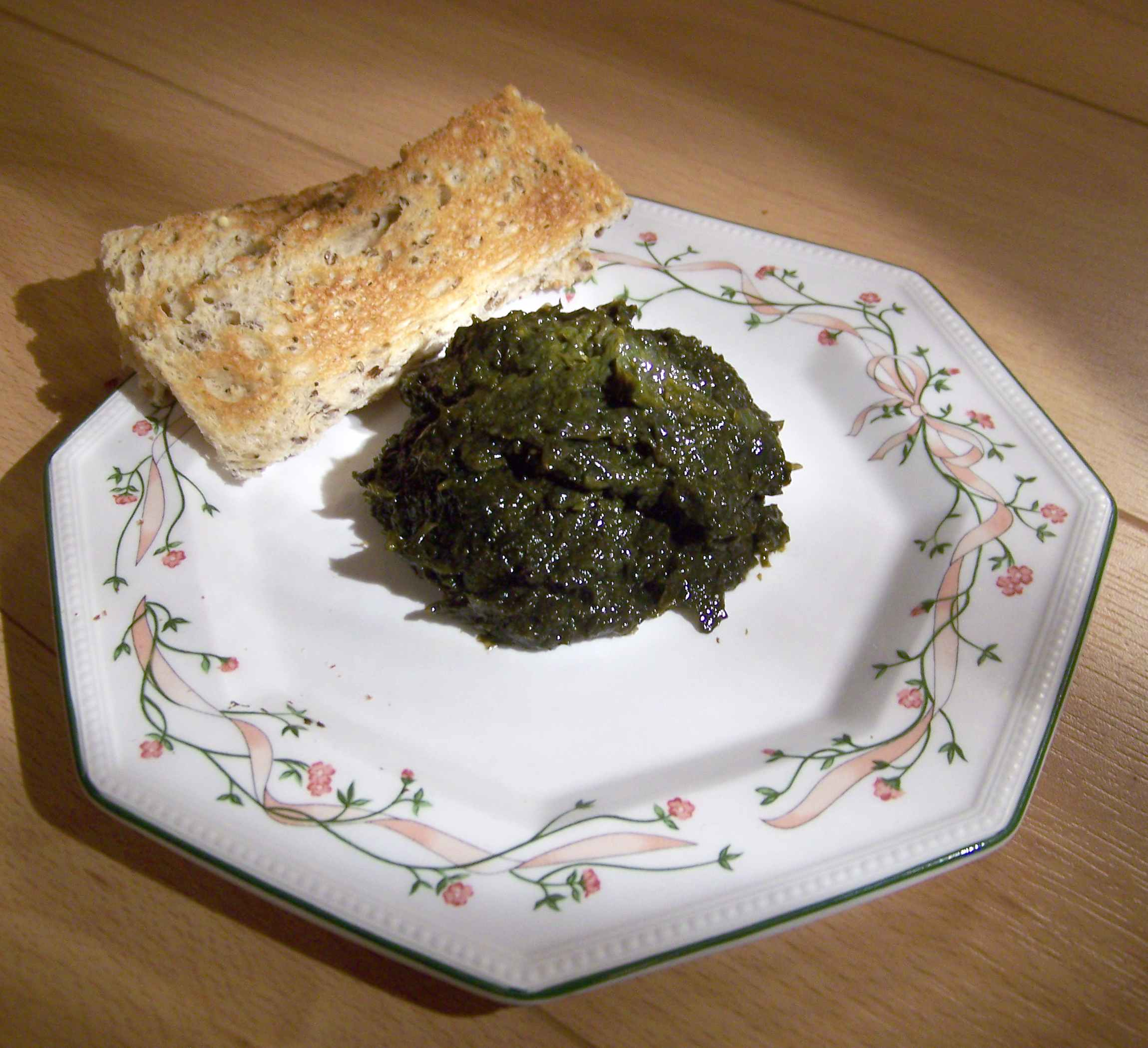
"Eternal Beau" pattern

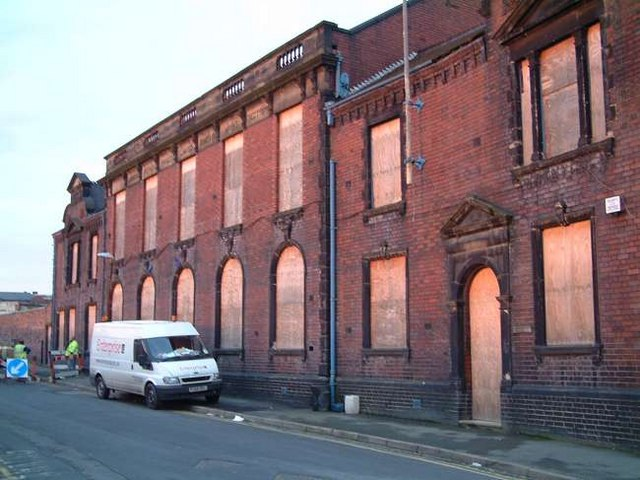
The Trent Works, Hanley, built 1896, for "sanitary wares" (toilets and sinks etc)

Having established a solid reputation producing basic "whiteware", the company developed a product known as "semi-porcelain", a range of pottery that had the characteristics of fine china, but the durability of ironstoneware. This kind of tableware soon became very popular in the United States due to its durability and low cost. In 1889, the Hanley pottery was opened, later the Alexander pottery, and in 1891 the Imperial Works Pottery. In 1896, the Trent Sanitary Works was opened for the production of non-tableware products, and Alfred Johnson left the business to establish his own pottery. By 1898, Robert Johnson had relocated to New York City to manage Johnson Brothers' rapid expansion into the North American market.

== Challenge and response (1900–1960) ==
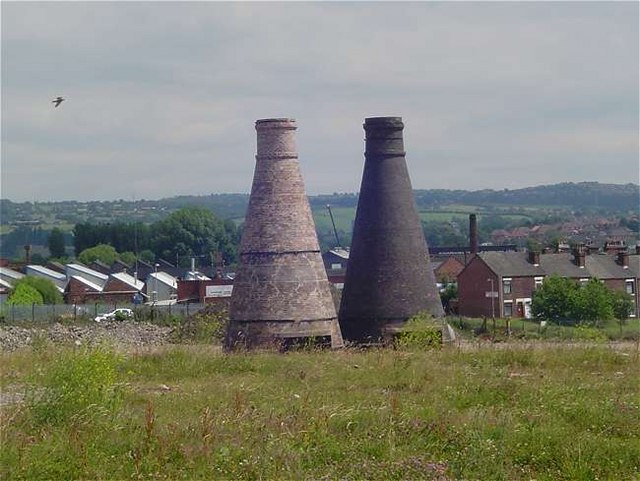
Disused bottle kilns from one of the factories

Johnson Brothers continued its growth in the tableware industry throughout the first half of the 20th century. After 1918, the popular "Dawn" range of coloured bodies was launched, and Johnson Brothers began exporting its tableware throughout the British Empire. The pattern "Old Britain Castles" was introduced in 1930, followed by "Historic America" in 1938. During the 1930s, the original factory in Charles Street closed, and new technology was introduced with the development of modern systems of firing using electricity rather than coal. This in turn led to a better quality product, lower prices, and better conditions for the workforce. However, World War II nearly halted production, and shipments to the U.S. became sporadic.

The post-war period saw a major overhaul of equipment and facilities. Various plants in Britain, Canada, and Australia were purchased for decorating, glazing, and firing of pieces. Johnson Brothers gained Royal Warrants from Queen Elizabeth II and the Queen Mother. The company was twice awarded the Queen's Award to Industry for their contributions to the British economy.

== Restructuring (1960–2000) ==
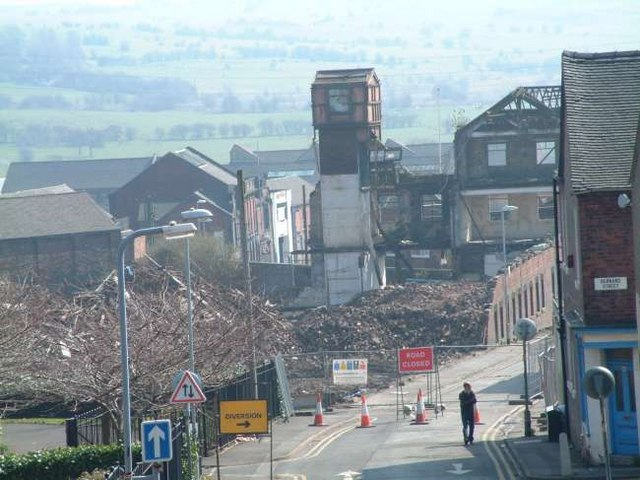
Demolishing Johnson Brothers Pottery, Etruria, Staffordshire, 2004.

Despite this award, the late 1960s saw changing popular taste, rising competition and spiralling production costs which led Johnson Brothers to curtail further expansion. In 1968, in order to remain competitive, Johnson Brothers joined the Wedgwood Group. This was the period during which the popular "Summerfields" range was produced: a white background with pink flowers and buds around the lip, finished with a grey foliage and a black non-complete edging line. This facilitated a further restructuring of the company and expansion into new markets. In 1981, Johnson Brothers launched the famous "Heritage" range, including the most popular earthenware range of all time - "Eternal Beau". In 1995, the Hanley Pottery closed down and was soon demolished. At the same time, a review of many of the traditional Johnson Brothers lines led to a rationalization and a reduction in the number of patterns produced. In 2000, the tableware division of Johnson's temporarily moved to the J. & G. Meakin Eagle Pottery works.

== Final years (2003–2015) ==
In 2003, the manufacturing of Johnson Brothers products in Britain ceased and was transferred to China. According to the Waterford Wedgwood company, production in China cost 70% less than did production in Britain. The closure of British production facilities eliminated around 1,000 British jobs, contributing to the rising unemployment in Britain's old pottery-making centre. The Eagle Pottery works were demolished in 2005. The mark on this Chinese-made product read "England 1883". In 2015, the Waterford Wedgwood group was acquired by the Finnish company Fiskars, which continued the Waterford and Wedgwood brands, but discontinued production of Johnson Brothers.

== See also ==
- J. W. Pankhurst & Co.
