= Ridgway Potteries =

Family of potters, operating from late 18th to late 20th century

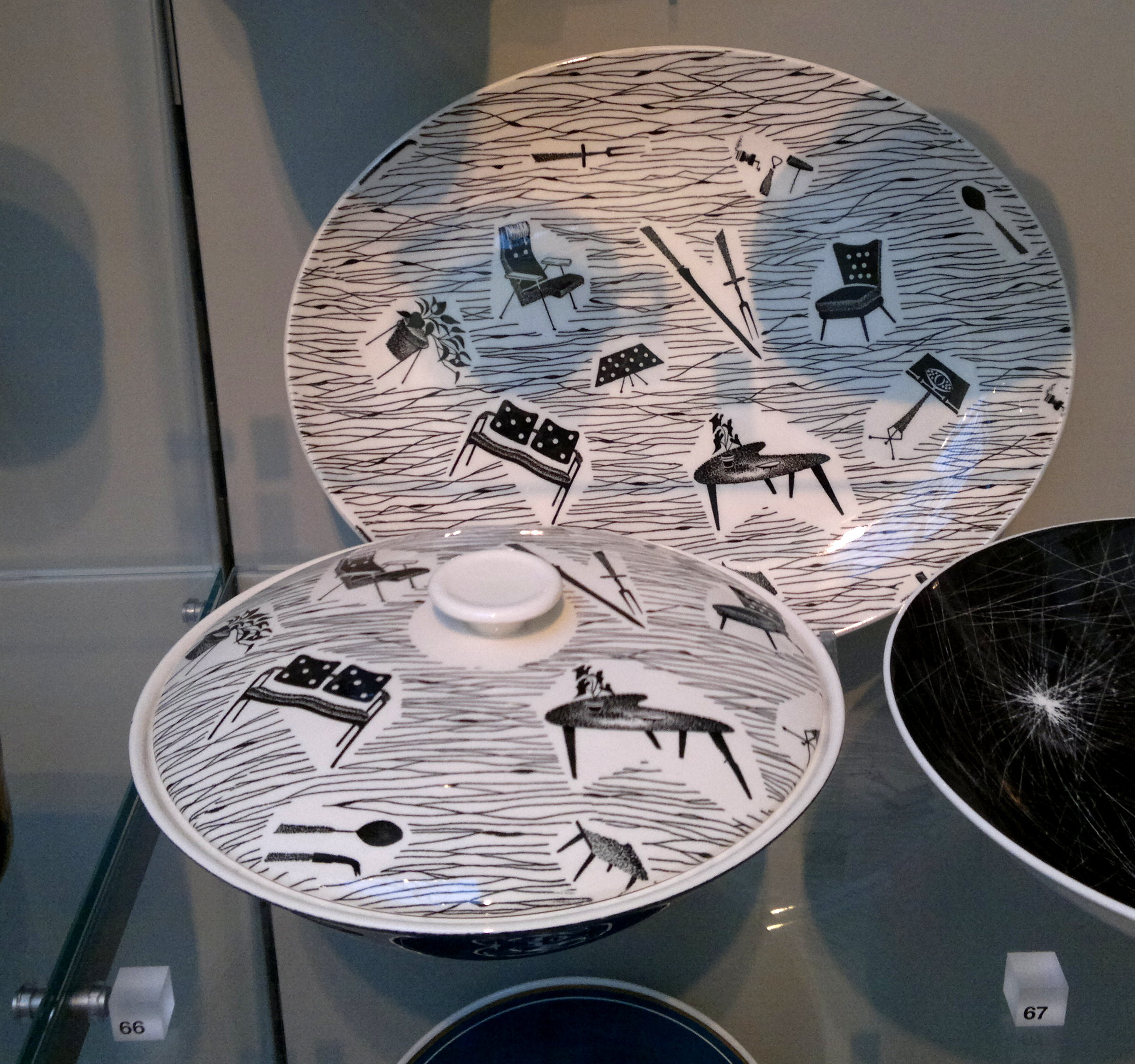
Homemaker tureen and plate of 1957.

The Ridgway family was one of the important dynasties manufacturing Staffordshire pottery, with a large number of family members and business names, over a period from the 1790s to the late 20th century. In their heyday in the mid-19th century there were several different potteries run by different branches of the family. Most of their wares were earthenware, but often of very high quality, but stoneware and bone china were also made. Many earlier pieces were unmarked and identifying them is difficult or impossible. Typically for Staffordshire, the various businesses, initially set up as partnerships, changed their official names rather frequently, and often used different trading names, so there are a variety of names that can be found.

The various Ridgway companies made a huge range of wares, carefully following market demand. They can generally be described as serving the middle and upper parts of the market, avoiding the cheapest popular wares. As with other factories, a great amount of good quality earthenware was transfer-printed with heavily elaborate designs, mostly in a durable underglaze cobalt blue. Much of this went to the American market, and was given American designs of landscapes (the "Beauties of America" series dates to about 1820) and national heroes.

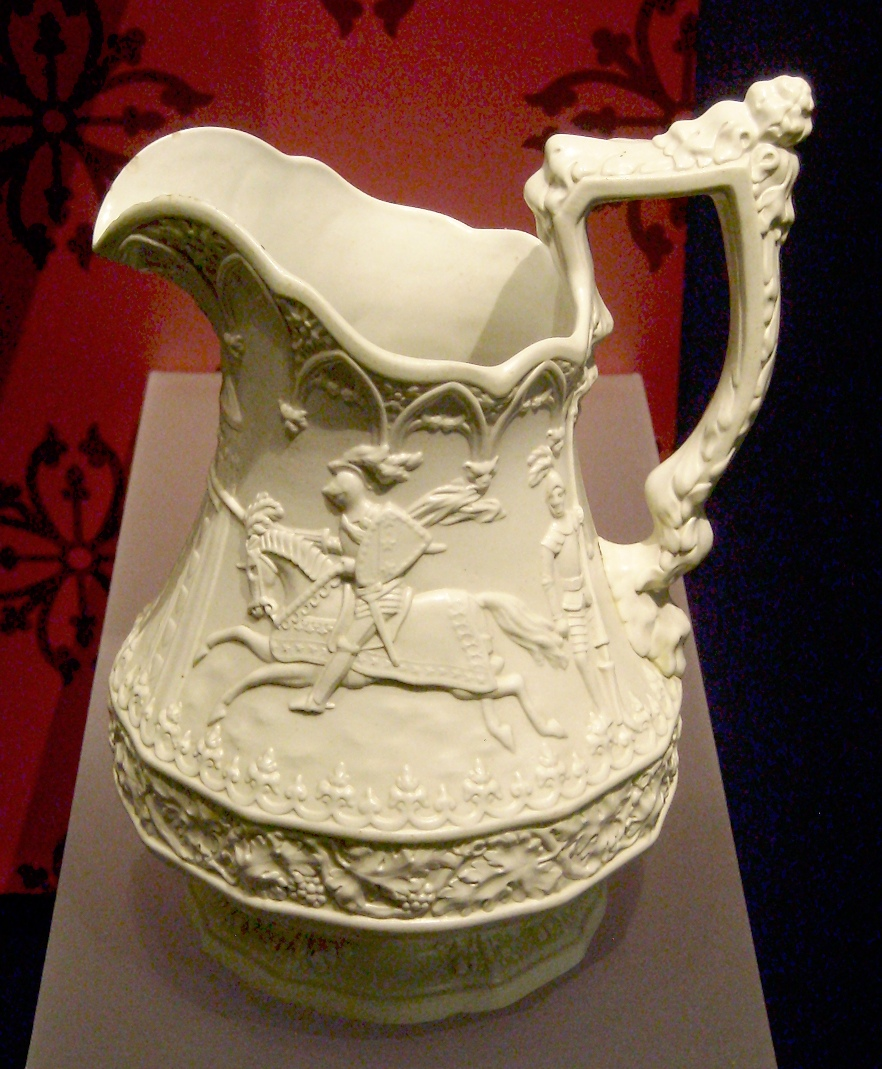
Stoneware jug celebrating the Eglinton Tournament of 1839

From 1808 porcelain, that is to say bone china, was produced, in a great profusion of patterns, for which many of the pattern books survive. The styles are typical for the period, with many flowers, landscapes, and some modified Neoclassical and Chinese (or "Anglo-oriental") treatments. Wedgwood jasperware effects were rendered in glazed porcelain. Much of the porcelain was also transfer-printed, or combined this and china painting by hand. Grove characterizes the wares as "inspired by those of Rockingham, Spode and Worcester".

In later periods, the many branches of the family businesses maintained a similar position in the market, and followed design trends at a rather safe distance. Ridgway & Abington (1835–60, Church Works, Hanley, part of the William Ridgway "group") seem only to have made the plain stoneware jugs with heavy relief moulded decoration, though other Ridgway companies also made these. From the 1950s Homemaker tableware, was a cheap brand that introduced the mass market to fashionable contemporary design, initially only sold in Woolworths.

== History ==
The first generation were Job Ridgway (1759–1813) and his older brother George (c. 1758–1823), who together established a factory at Hanley in 1794, along with a W. Smith who died in 1798. Job at least had trained in pottery; in fact, he records in a memoir that their father Ralph, of Great Chell had "erected a Pot-works, but being dissipated and thoughtless, he was soon involved in misfortunes, and reduced to the necessity of working for a livelihood" to support his ten children. Job and his sons were very devout Methodists. The two brothers split their partnership in about 1800 to allow each to introduce their sons to the business. George and his son traded until at least 1815, although little is known about their business.

Job's two sons, John and William, were both to be very successful. On ending the partnership with his brother, Job began a new factory at Shelton, Staffordshire, now a suburb of Stoke, called the Cauldon Place Works. This began production in 1802, and was to remain one of the family's main sites, and a pottery until recent decades. In 1808 he gave John and William, then in their early twenties, shares in the business (which became "Ridgway & Sons"), and also began to make bone china. Job died in 1814, when "John and William Ridgway" or "J and W Ridgway" became the usual name of the business.

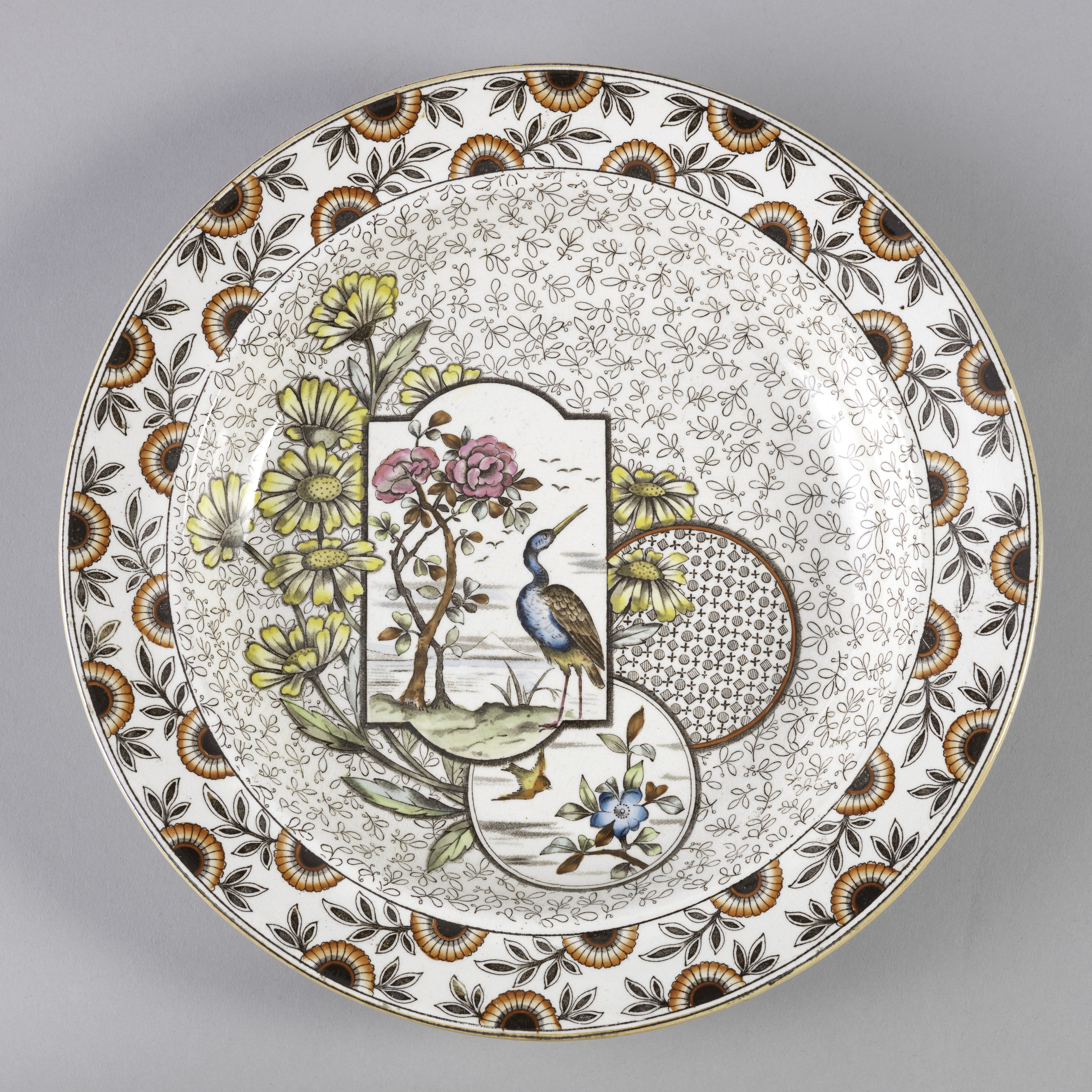
Transfer-printed creamware bowl in the "Variety" pattern, influenced by Japonism, c. 1879–85, "Ridgways"

The two brothers decided to go their own ways in 1830, by which time they were also running their uncle George's Bell Works, which William took, while John stayed at Cauldon Place. Of the two, John's products were very high quality, and he was made the "Royal Potter" to Queen Victoria after the Great Exhibition of 1851, reviving the title Queen Charlotte had given to Josiah Wedgwood. This allowed him to incorporate the Royal Arms into his marks. William concentrated rather more on a middle market, and produced large amounts for the American market. Indeed, by the 1840s William was planning to open a pottery in Kentucky with his New York agent, Charles Cartlidge, though in the end Cartlidge set up with American partners. William went bankrupt in 1848, although the Bell Works remained in the family.

William's son, Edward John (1814–96) was also very active, and his two sons took the businesses into the 20th century. Edward John's sister Emma married a Francis Morley (d. 1883) who was one of a number of other names of partners appearing in business names with the Ridgways. "Cauldon" also appears in various company names and brands; Cauldon Ware, was a term for early transfer-printed wares, much of which was exported to the United States,

Ridgway Pottery later merged with the Booths & Colclough China Company during the 1940s, and later became a part of Royal Doulton in 1972.

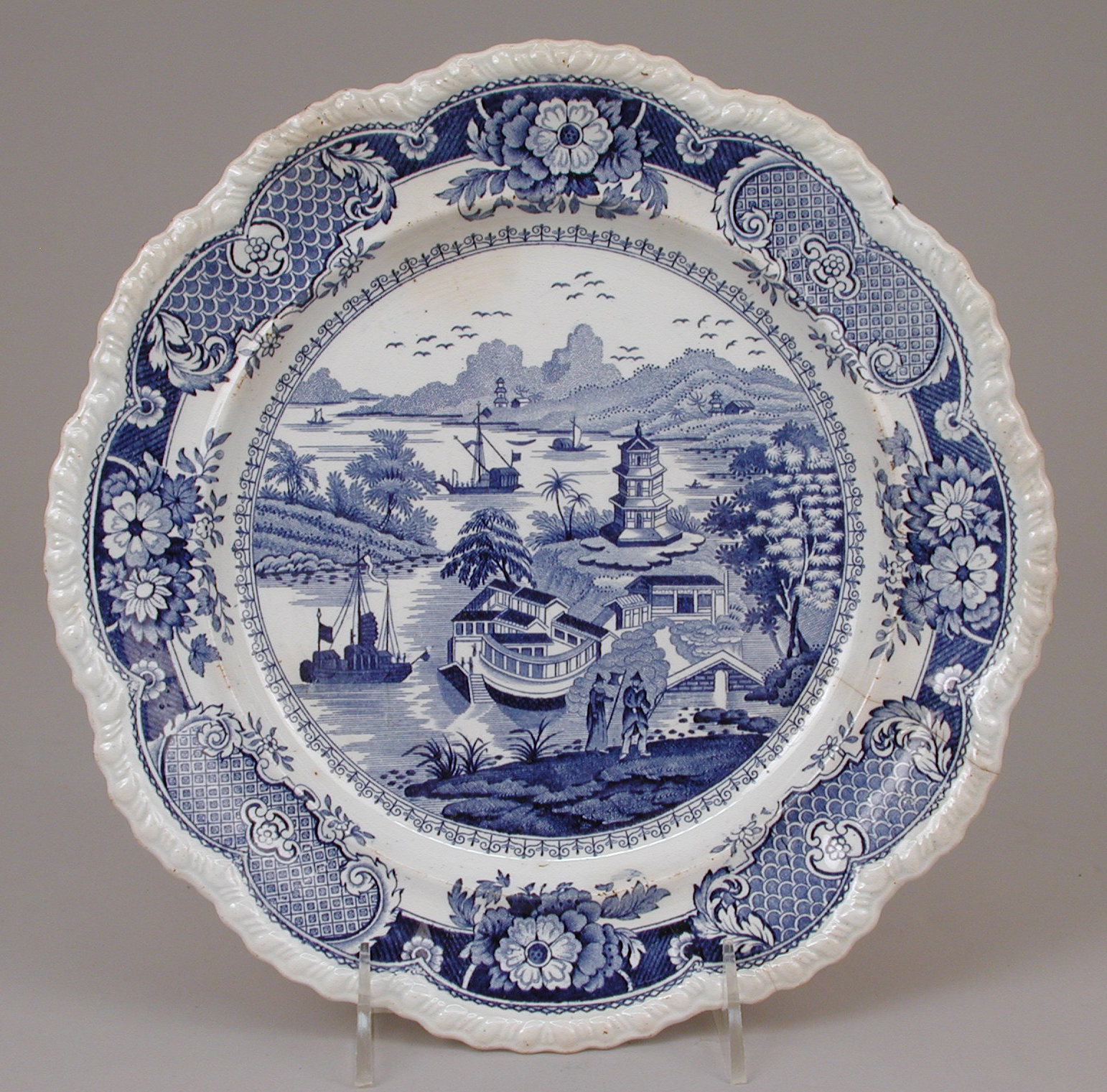
Transfer-printed creamware plate, c 1814–30, John and William Ridgway

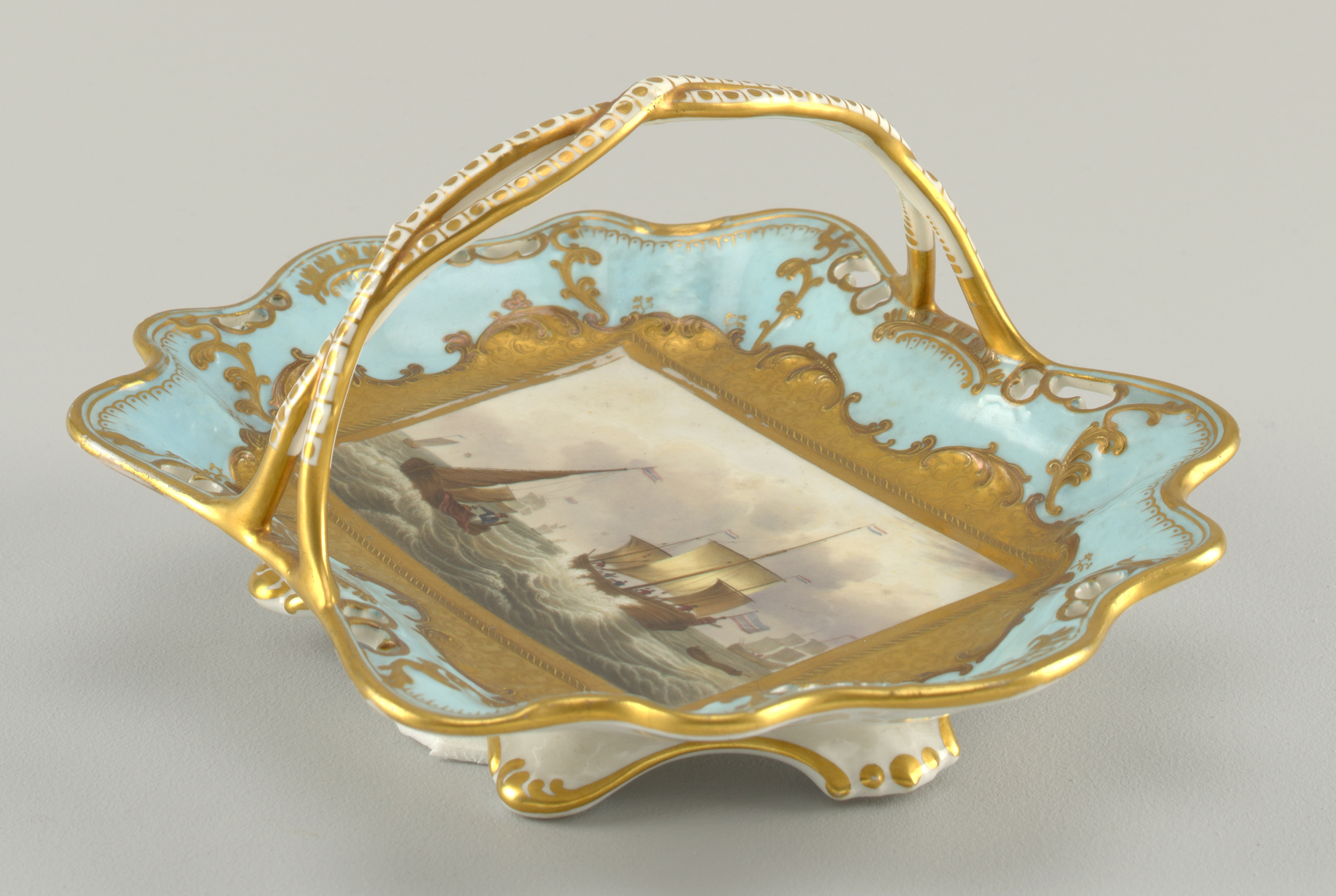
Porcelain dish, hand-painted not printed. John Ridgway, c. 1835

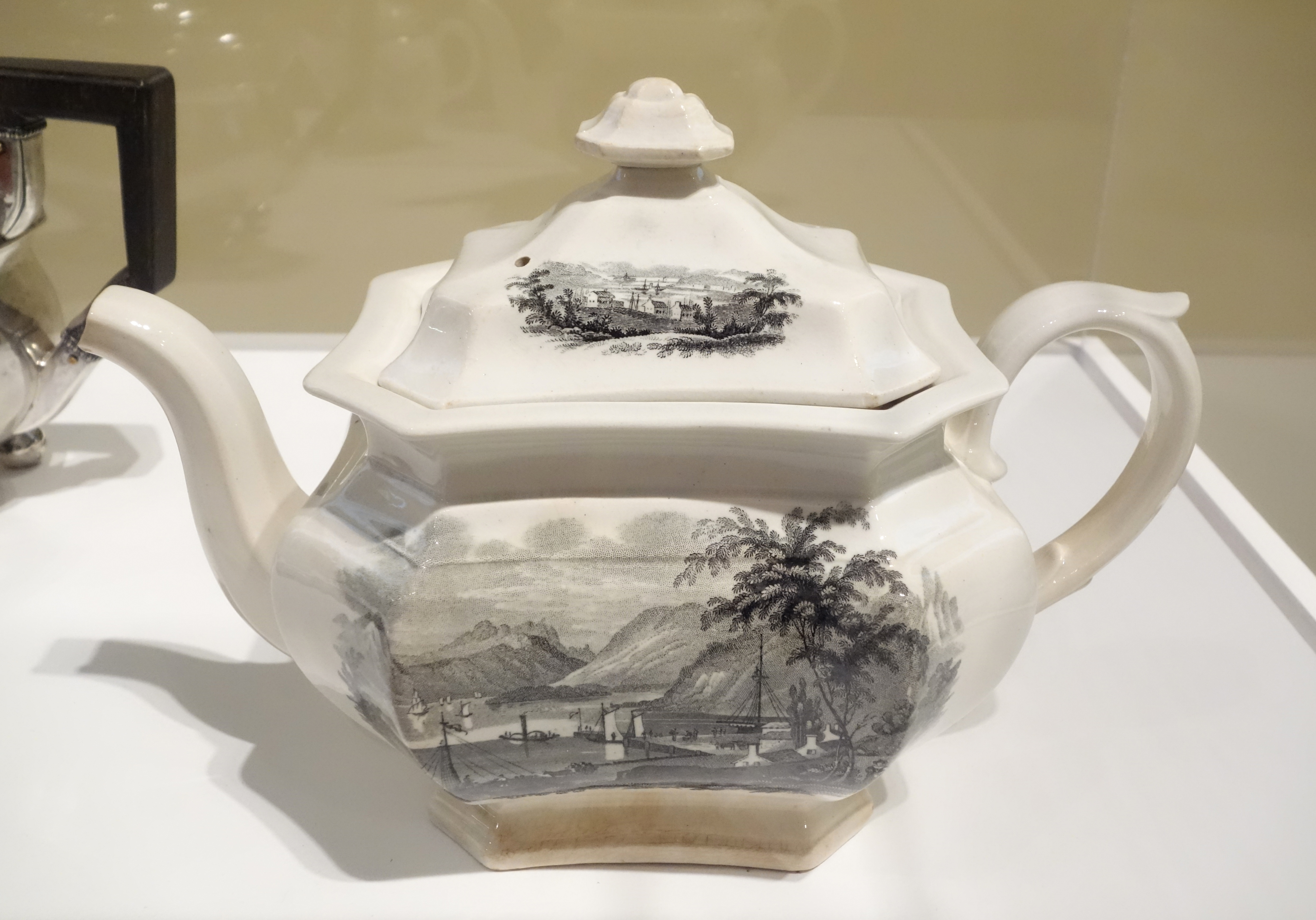
Transfer-printed teapot for the American market, c. 1845, showing Peekskill Landing on the Hudson River, William Ridgway & Co

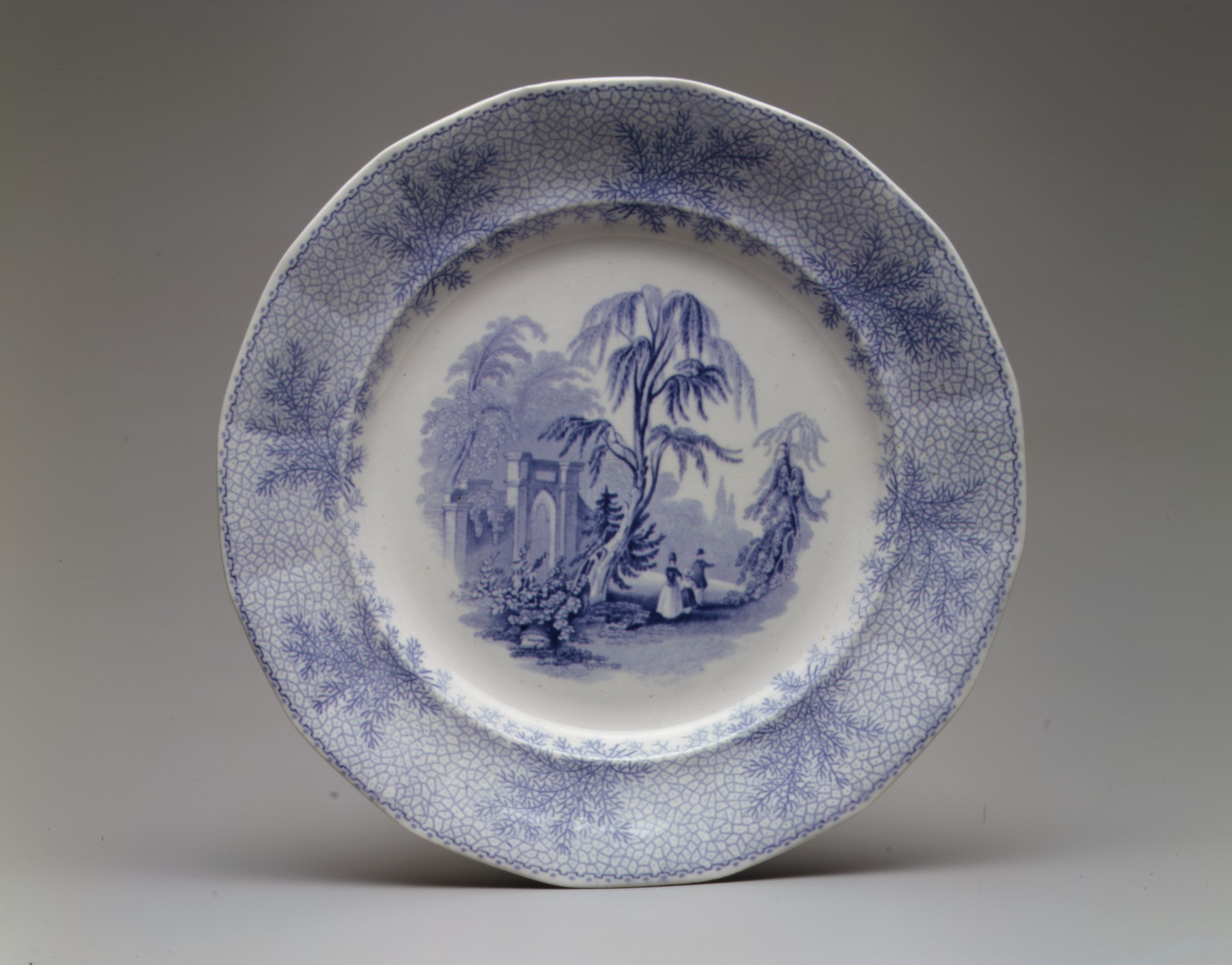
1840s plate for the American market

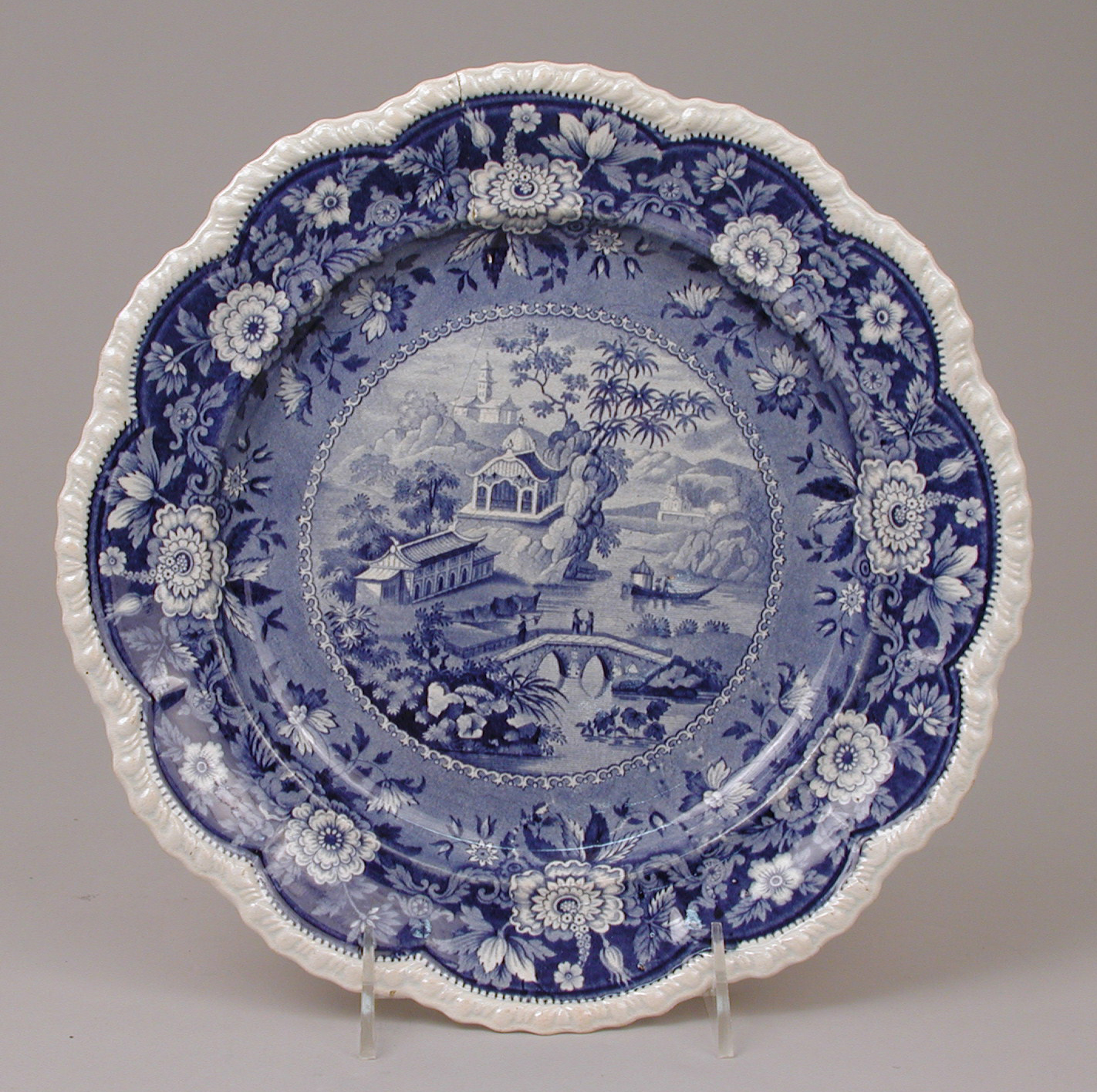
Plate from the "Asiatic Palaces" series, 1840s

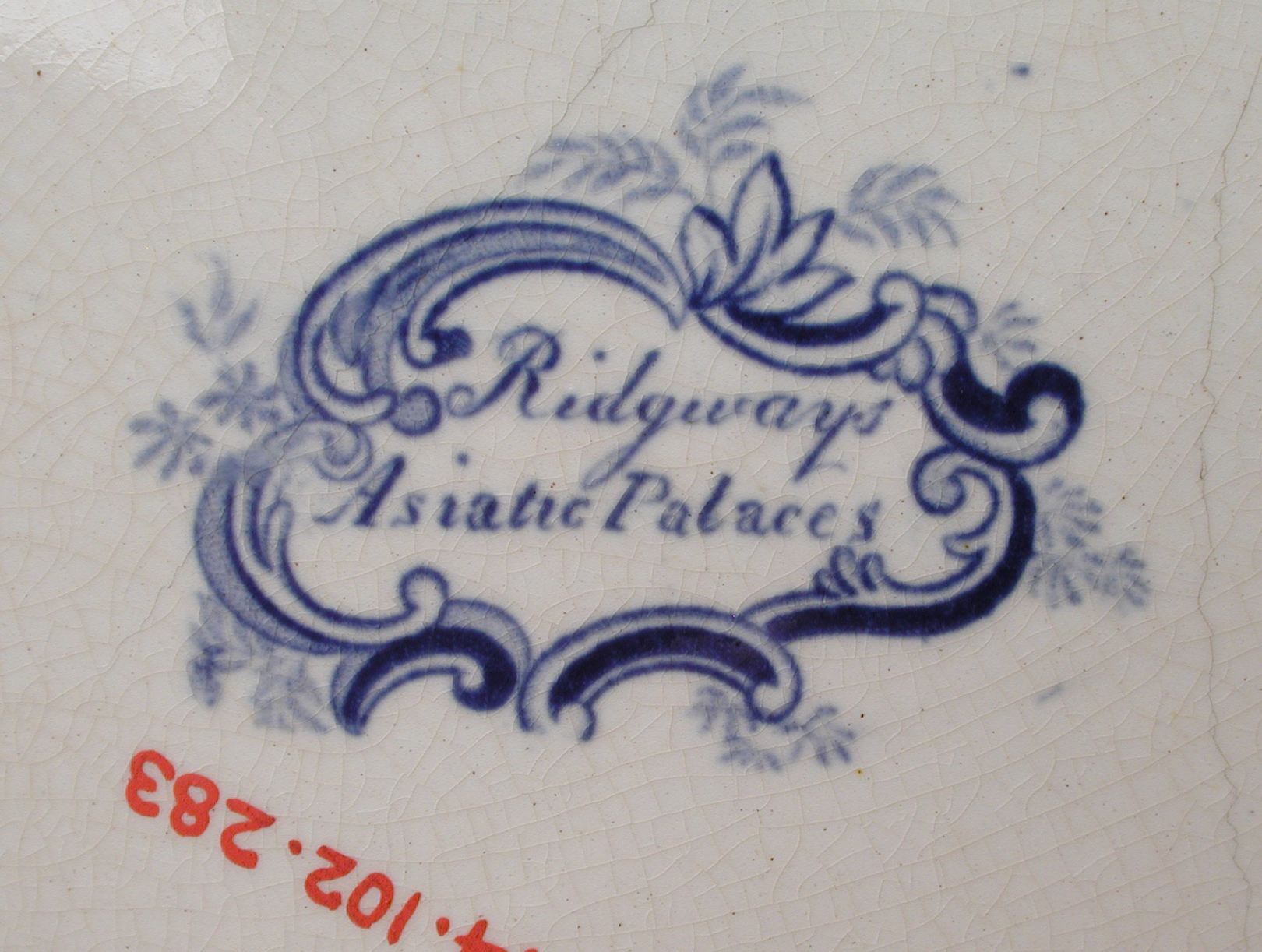
Mark for the "Asiatic Palaces" series, 1840s

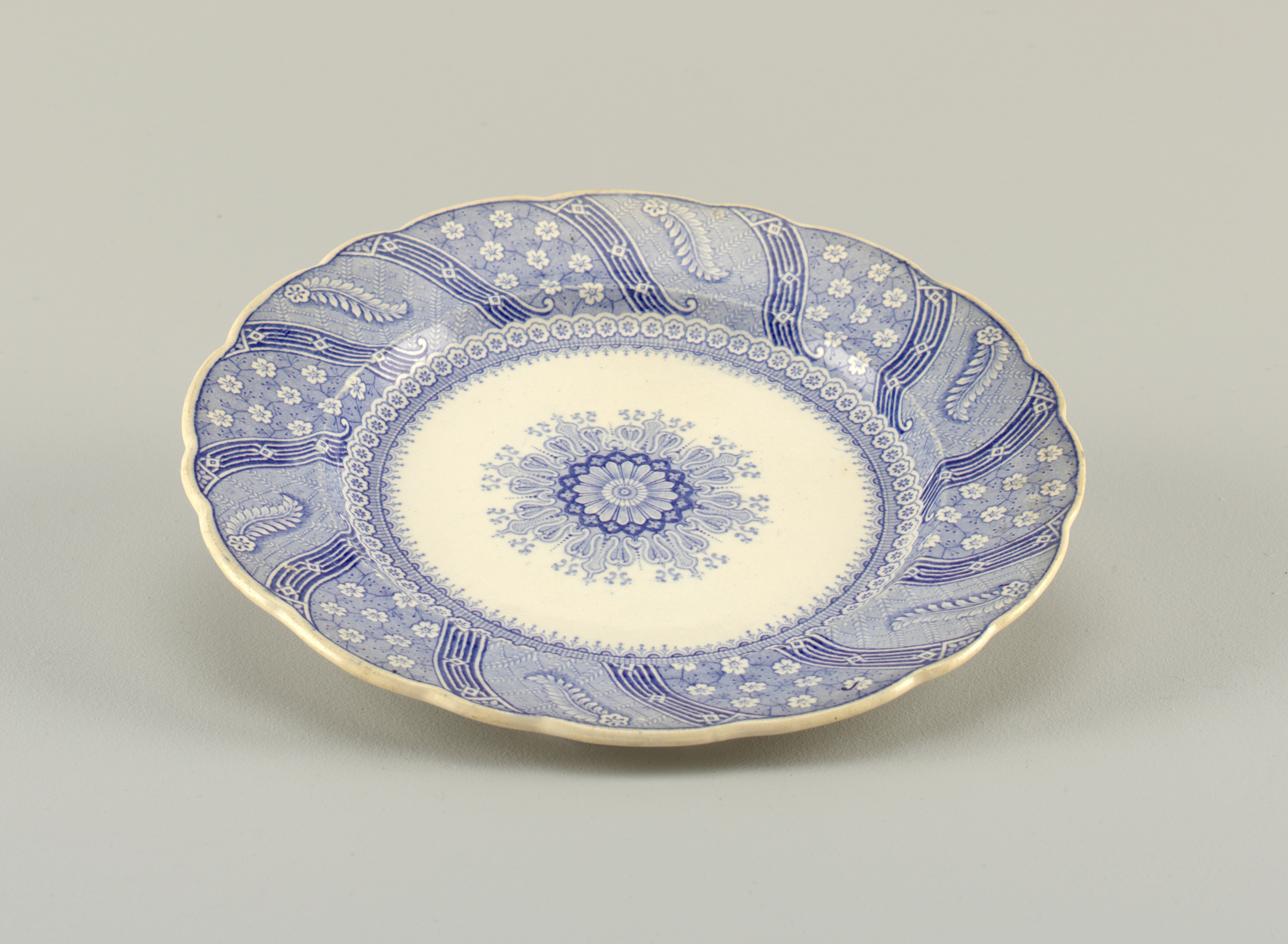
"Western Star" pattern, mid-19th century, William Ridgway & Co

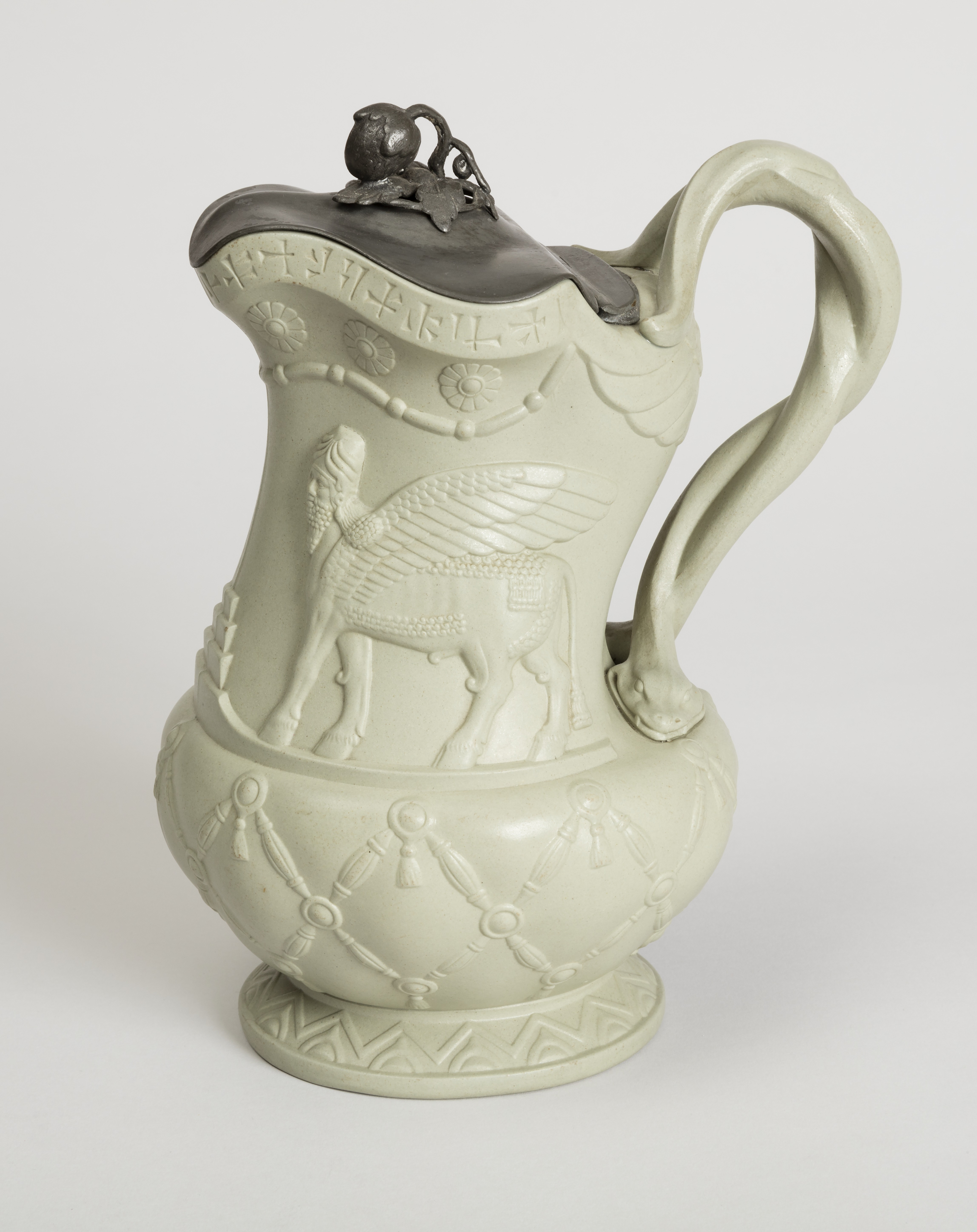
"Nineveh" jug, c. 1851, Ridgway & Abington. Austen Henry Layard's Nineveh and its Remains of 1849 had created a craze for the style of Assyrian sculpture.

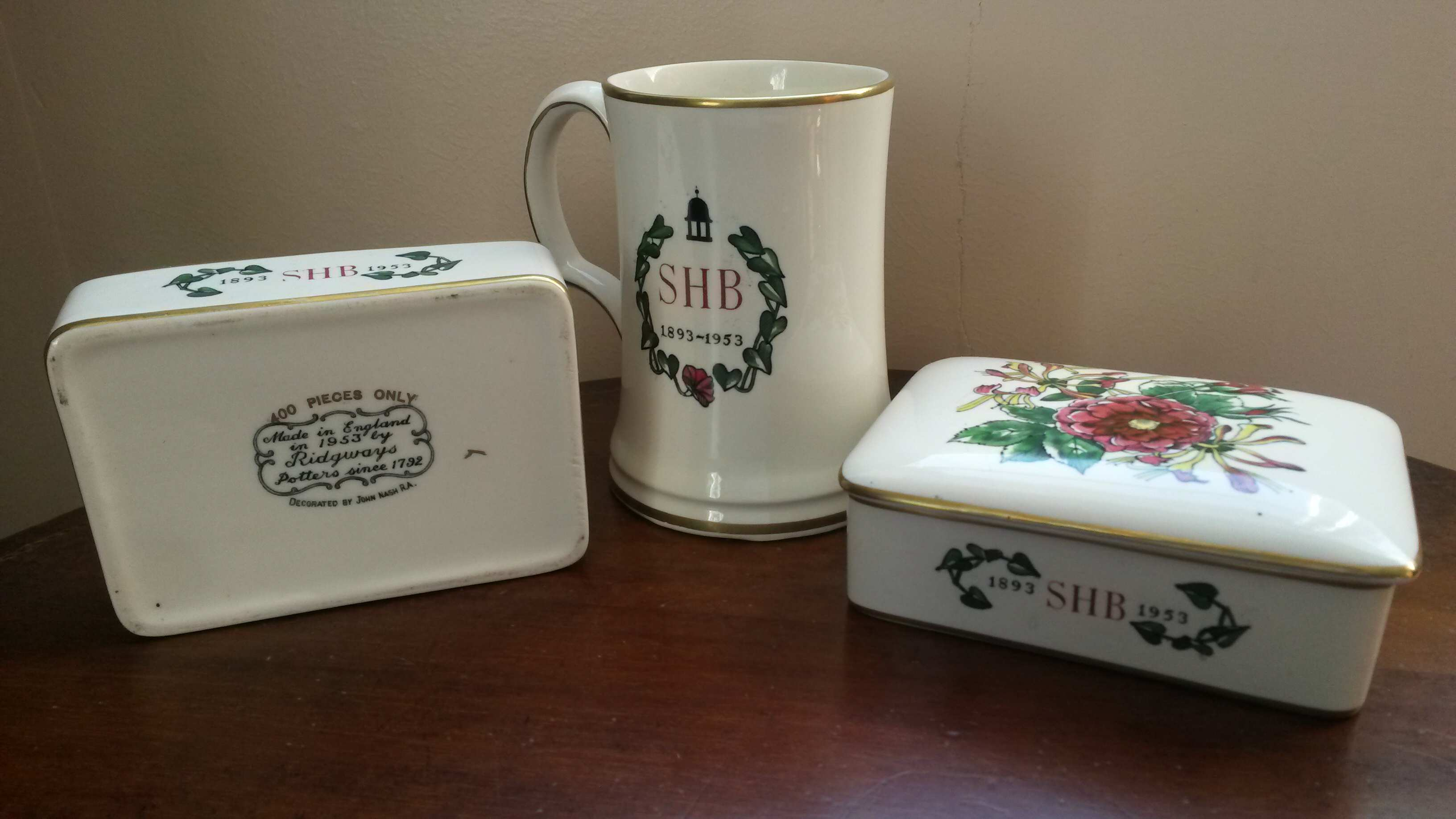
S. H. Benson Ltd commemorative china, 1953, designed by John Nash
