= Jessie Tait =

English ceramic designer

- Born: 6 March 1928; Stoke-on-Trent
- Died: 14 January 2010 (aged 81)
- Education: Burslem School of Art

Dorothy Jessie Tait (6 March 1928 – 14 January 2010) was a prolific English ceramic designer working in the Stoke-on-Trent pottery industries, most prominently for Midwinter, from the 1940s to the 1980s.

== Life and work ==
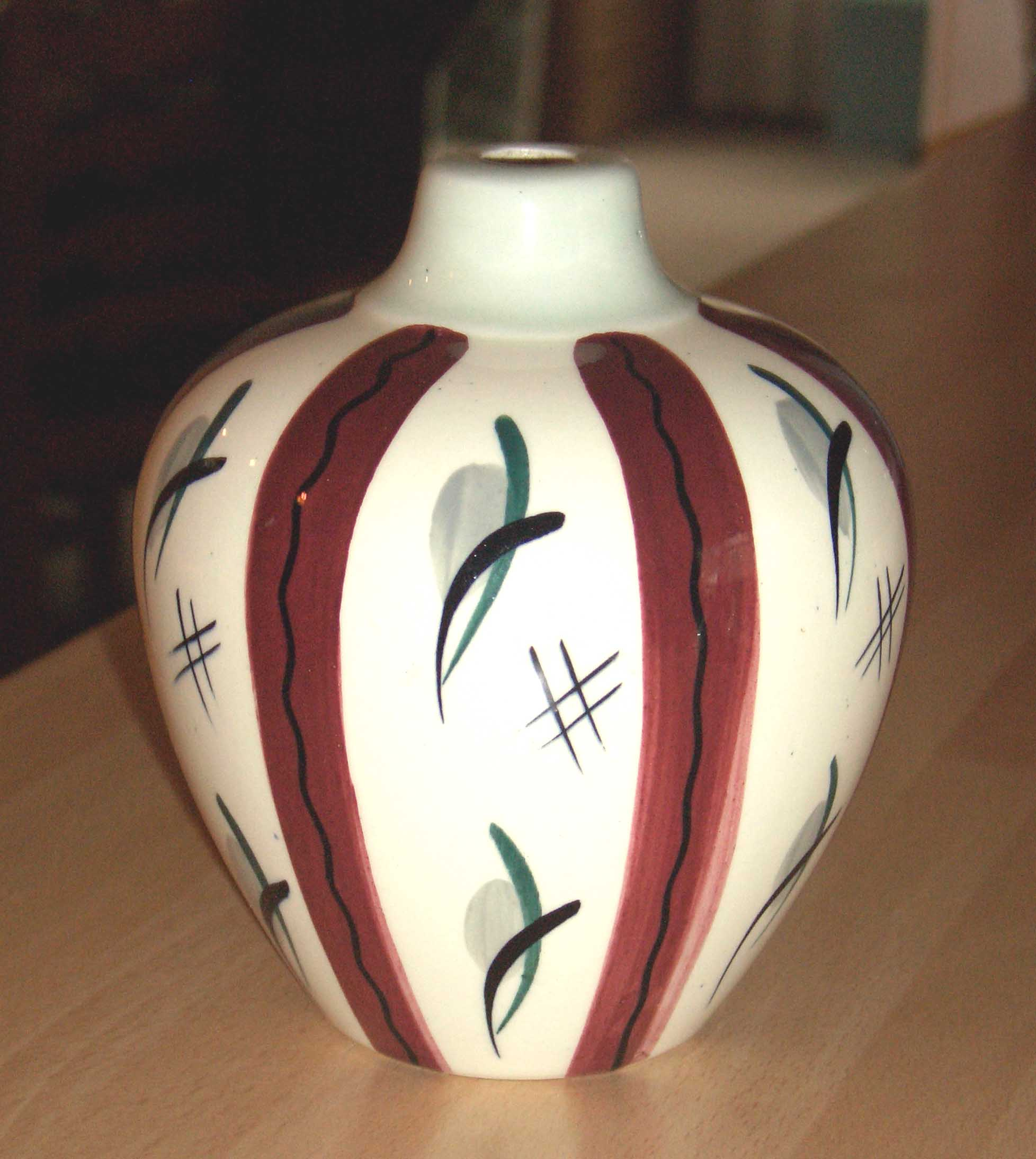
A Clayburn lampbase painted with a version of Tait's 'Fiesta' design

Born in Stoke-on-Trent, Tait studied at the Burslem School of Art. She first worked as a junior designer to Charlotte Rhead, and then as designer for the Midwinter Pottery between 1946 and 1974. The Midwinter Pottery was taken over by J. & G. Meakin in 1968, and again by Wedgwood in 1970. Jessie Tait moved from Midwinter to Johnson Brothers, another part of the Wedgwood group, and retired in the early 1990s.

Many of her designs were mass-produced by the Midwinter Pottery on dinner services, and tea and coffee sets. In the 1950s these were hand painted, and well known designs included 'Red Domino' and 'Zambesi'. Her style was often detailed and geometric, making an effective transition to transfer printed wares, with 'Spanish Garden' and a range of designs on the Stonehenge shape in the 1970s continuing her success.

Midwinter produced a series of Jessie Tait vases and beakers with tube-lined decoration. Tait also worked at home in the evenings, making intricate tube-lined wares on terracotta bodies for friends and family. She also designed for the Clayburn Pottery.

Like other Potteries-based ceramic designers such as Clarice Cliff, Susie Cooper and Charlotte Rhead, her work has become highly sought after and valued by pottery collectors.

== Gallery ==
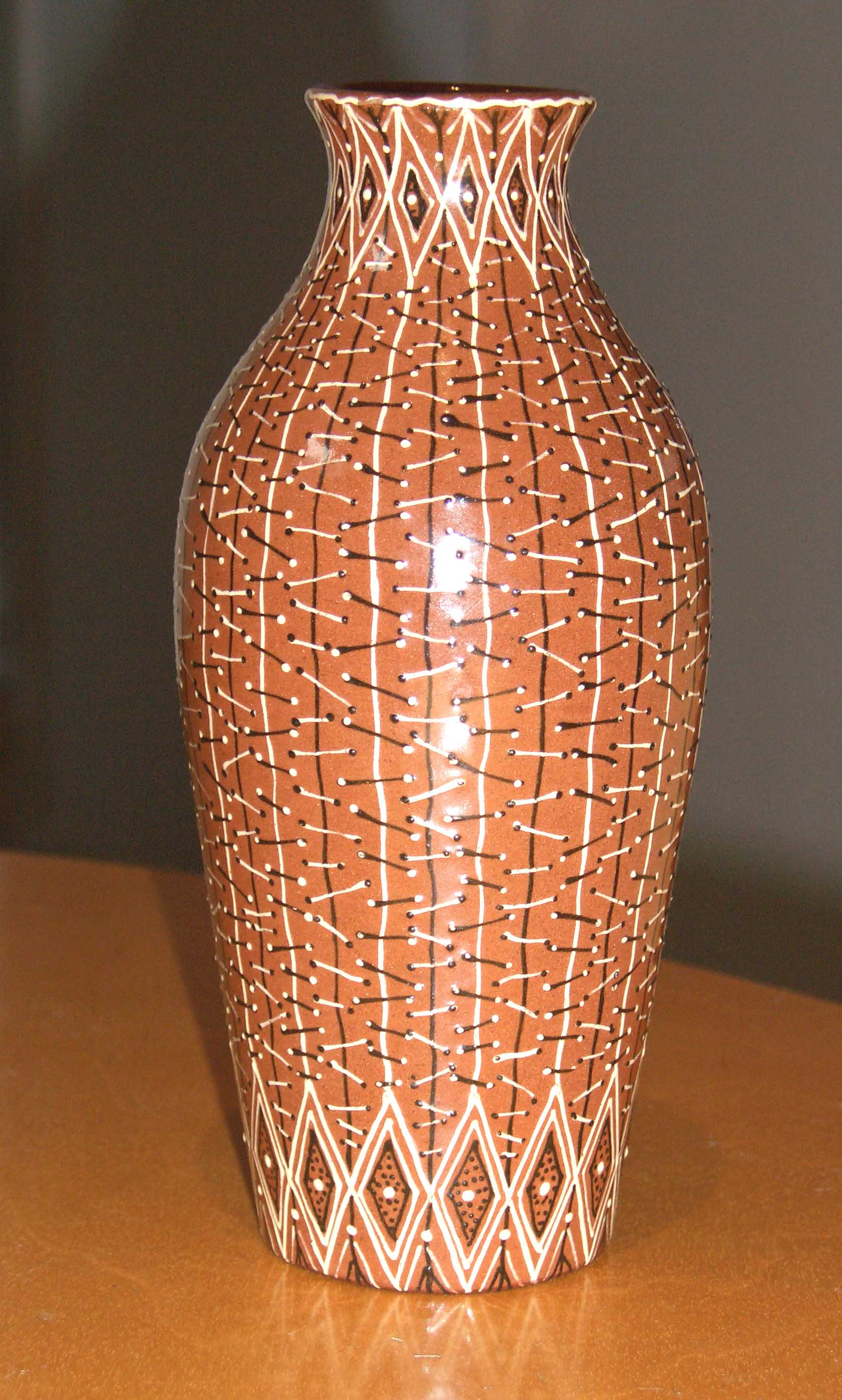
Jessie Tait tube lined vase, dated 1957

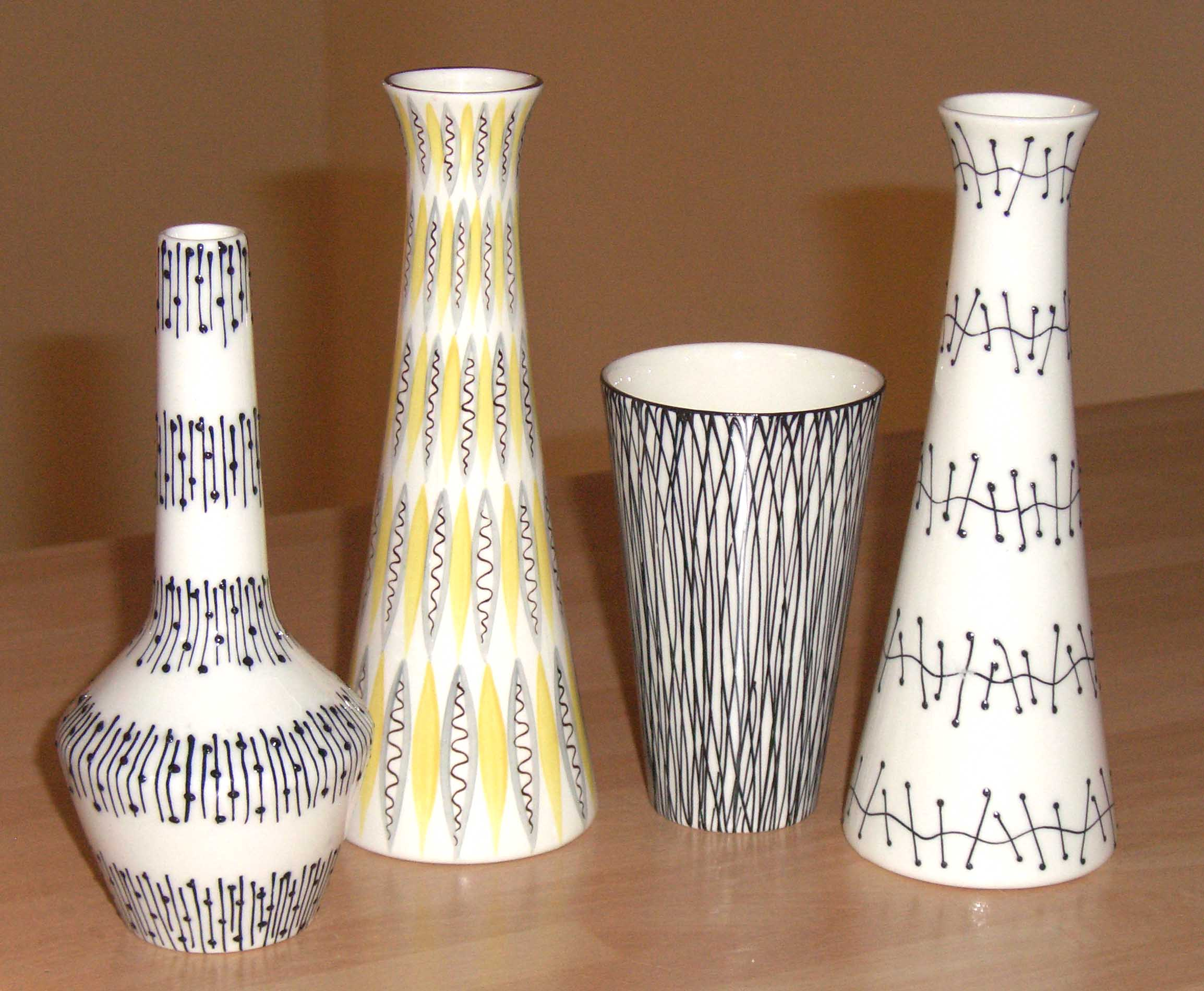
Vases and a beaker by Jessie Tait for Midwinter Pottery

== Bibliography ==
- Midwinter Pottery - Steven Jenkins, Richard Dennis, 2003, ISBN 0-903685-90-6
- Charlotte Higgins (12 February 2010), Jessie Tait obituary The Guardian (guardian.co.uk), retrieved 5 July 2011
