= Keith Murray (ceramic artist) =

New-Zealand-born British architect and industrial designer

Keith Murray MC RDI FRIBA
- Keith Murray at work
- Born: 5 July 1892; Mount Eden, Auckland, New Zealand
- Died: 16 May 1981 (aged 88); Dorset, England
- Occupation: Architect
- Spouse: Mary Beatrice de Carteret Malet (m. 1948)
- Children: 1
- Practice: Murray & White; Ramsey, Murray & White; Ramsey, Murray, White & Ward; Murray, Ward & Partners
- Buildings: Wedgwood factory, Barlaston (1940); BEA hangars, London Airport (1953); Terminal building, Hong Kong Airport / Kai Tak (1962)

Keith Day Pearce Murray MC RDI FRIBA (5 July 1892 – 16 May 1981) was a New-Zealand-born British architect and industrial designer, known for ceramic, silver and glass designs for Wedgwood, Mappin & Webb and Stevens & Williams in the 1930s and 1940s. He is considered to be one of the most influential designers of the Art Deco / Modern age.

== Early life and education ==
Murray was born in the Auckland suburb of Mount Eden on 5 July 1892. His father, Charles Henry Murray, from Peterhead, Scotland, and his mother, Lilian Day George, from New Plymouth, New Zealand, had married in New Plymouth in March 1889. Charles, a printer and commercial stationer in Auckland for fifteen years, died after a long illness, aged 43, at home in Cheltenham Road, Devonport, on 2 February 1898. In January 1900, his mother, Lilian, married Dr William Chisholm Wilson McDowell at St Mary's Church, New Plymouth. Younger sister Evelyn was a bridesmaid to their mother.

Murray was educated at Prince Albert College, Auckland. When he was 13 years old, his stepfather received 12 months leave from the University Board to attend to medical studies at Edinburgh University. In consequence, the family moved to Britain in March 1906, where Murray attended Mill Hill School in London. After returning to New Zealand in April 1907, he attended King's College in Remuera, by which he passed the December 1908 University of New Zealand matriculation examinations.

== Career ==
=== Architecture and aero club ===
Manurewa No. 1 at Glenora Park, Papakura, 1911; Murray is right of the tail group

By 1910–11 Murray was working as a draughtsman for the architect Arthur Pollard Wilson / Wilson & Moodie in Victoria Arcade, Queen Street, Auckland. In 1910 he took on the office of secretary for the newly formed Aero Club of New Zealand, with Leo Walsh as club president. That year the club entertained Frederick Walker Baldwin and Alexander Graham Bell during their tour of Australia and New Zealand, they having expressed a great interest, on hearing of the club, to meet with club members and inspect their flying machines. Murray promoted the progress of the Walsh Aeroplane Syndicate's Howard Wright biplane, and club activities. In addition to designing the club's winged emblem badge, he also designed a glider for the club's in-house glider design competition, in which he gained second place out of the six entrants. He worked for Wilson & Moodie until 1914, when, it appears, he moved to England to study architecture.

=== First World War ===
Murray served as an officer of the Royal Flying Corps (RFC) and Royal Air Force (RAF) during the Great War. Having gained Aviator's Certificate No. 1290 in a Maurice Farman biplane at the Brooklands Military School and confirmation as second lieutenant on 1 June 1915, trained at Joyce Green and Dover from 16 June, advanced to rank of flying officer, No. 15 Special Reserve, on 18 August and lieutenant on 1 December, the squadron was deployed to France on observation and reconnaissance duties in December 1915. On 1 March 1916 he was appointed to flight commander and temporary captain, posted to No. 2 Squadron flying Royal Aircraft Factory B.E.2c.

Further postings back to No. 15 Special Reserve, from 14 June 1916, and No. 52 Squadron as squadron commander with the rank of major from 21 September 1917, led to command of No. 10 Squadron from 22 October 1917, which had been re-equipping with Armstrong Whitworth F.K.8 and moving to Abeele aerodrome, Belgium. From there the squadron took part in the Battle of Cambrai from 20 November 1917 and the German spring offensive from 21 March 1918. Murray said of the aircraft in relation to the reconnaissance work: "The big A-W was slow, but my pilots liked it for the particular job they had to do, and never regarded themselves as 'cold meat'. Owing to the nature of their work, they were rarely in a position to attack, but when attacked, as they were frequently enough, they gave a good enough account of themselves."

Murray was mentioned three or four times in General Sir Douglas Haig's despatches, and conferred the Military Cross in September 1917: "For conspicuous gallantry and devotion to duty on numerous occasions. He has displayed the utmost skill and fearlessness in ranging our batteries on hostile battery positions. Most of this work he had to carry out at a very low altitude and under very heavy fire, owing to the fact that the target was very well camouflaged, but, in spite of being repeatedly attacked and his machine several times damaged by anti-aircraft and machine gun fire, he was invariably successful." After the war ended he was permitted to retain rank of majorand conferred the Belgian Croix de Guerre. Since joining the RFC, he had flown Avro, Royal Aircraft Factory BE, Grahame-White and Bristol Fighter aircraft.

The transport NZSC RMS Remuera landed Murray and the New Zealand troops to an enthusiastic Auckland welcome on 5 May 1919, but he returned to London by the NZSC RMS Ruapehu on 23 August, to continue his studies in architecture at the Architectural Association School of Architecture.

=== Industrial design ===
Following the war, Murray graduated from the Architectural Association School of Architecture in London in 1921 and that year was elected an associate of the Royal Institute of British Architects. However a lack of work forced him to make a living as an illustrator for magazines. In 1928 he held his own show at the Lefevre Gallery in London but this was not to prove his passion.

His visits to exhibitions such as the 1925 Paris Exposition and the 1931 Exhibition of Swedish Industrial Art in London inspired Murray to seek out opportunities to design vases and tablewares for factory production, and as the Great Depression of the early 1930s further reduced the demand for architecture he became a full-time designer.

Murray first approached Arthur Marriott Powell about the possibility of working in Whitefriars Glass in London. Though his ideas proved unsuitable for their style of glass, he worked as a freelance designer at Stevens & Williams of Brierley Hill in the West Midlands in 1932. The trial pieces were shown in London that year and the 'Keith Murray range' was produced. Between 1932 and 1939 he produced over 1200 designs though many were only issued in quantities of six or twelve.

In 1932, he also began working 2–3 months a year for Josiah Wedgwood and Sons. Josiah Wedgwood invited him to visit the Wedgwood Factory. He was then employed to produce designs for dinner and teaware. It is here that Murray's famous ribbing designs began to form. His first range was entitled 'Annular'.

In 1934 the royal silversmiths Mappin & Webb approached him and asked if he could produce bowls and vases in silver working to the same designs as his Wedgwood pieces.

Most of his work was with vases, bowls and similar cylindrical ware, executed in a clean and restrained style with decoration often limited to deeply incised lines or smooth steps in the shape. The whole piece is usually one colour without applied decoration. From the beginning Murray's stature as a designer was recognised as every piece bore his signature above the Wedgwood mark.

In 1935, Murray was consulted on the design of glassware for the Orient Line's new liner, RMS Orion, of which, Brian O'Rorke was architect responsible for interior design. The following year, Murray was appointed architect in charge of designing the new Wedgwood factory at Barlaston, Staffordshire.

=== Second World War ===
In February 1939, some seven months before the outbreak of the Second World War, Murray returned to the RAF as a commissioned officer assigned to the Administrative and Special Duties Branch. Ill health required him to relinquish his commission in January 1942. In the 1942 New Year Honours he was again mentioned in despatches.

=== Architecture ===
Following the war he returned to architecture and left the field of industrial design.

Murray's work sold well at the time and has become increasingly sought after.

== Gallery ==
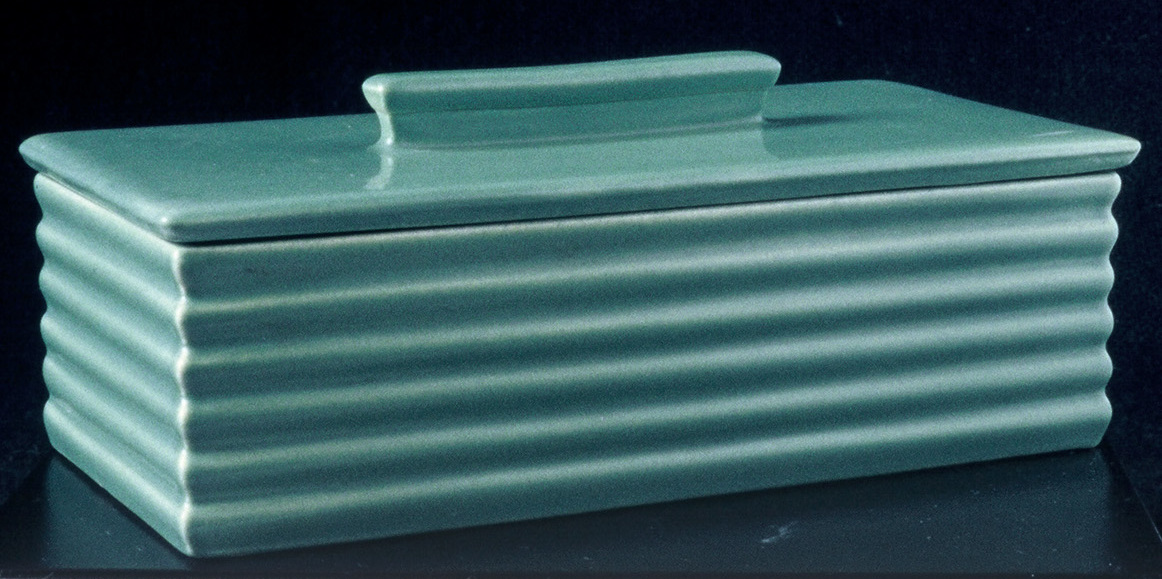
Wedgwood cigarette box, c. 1935

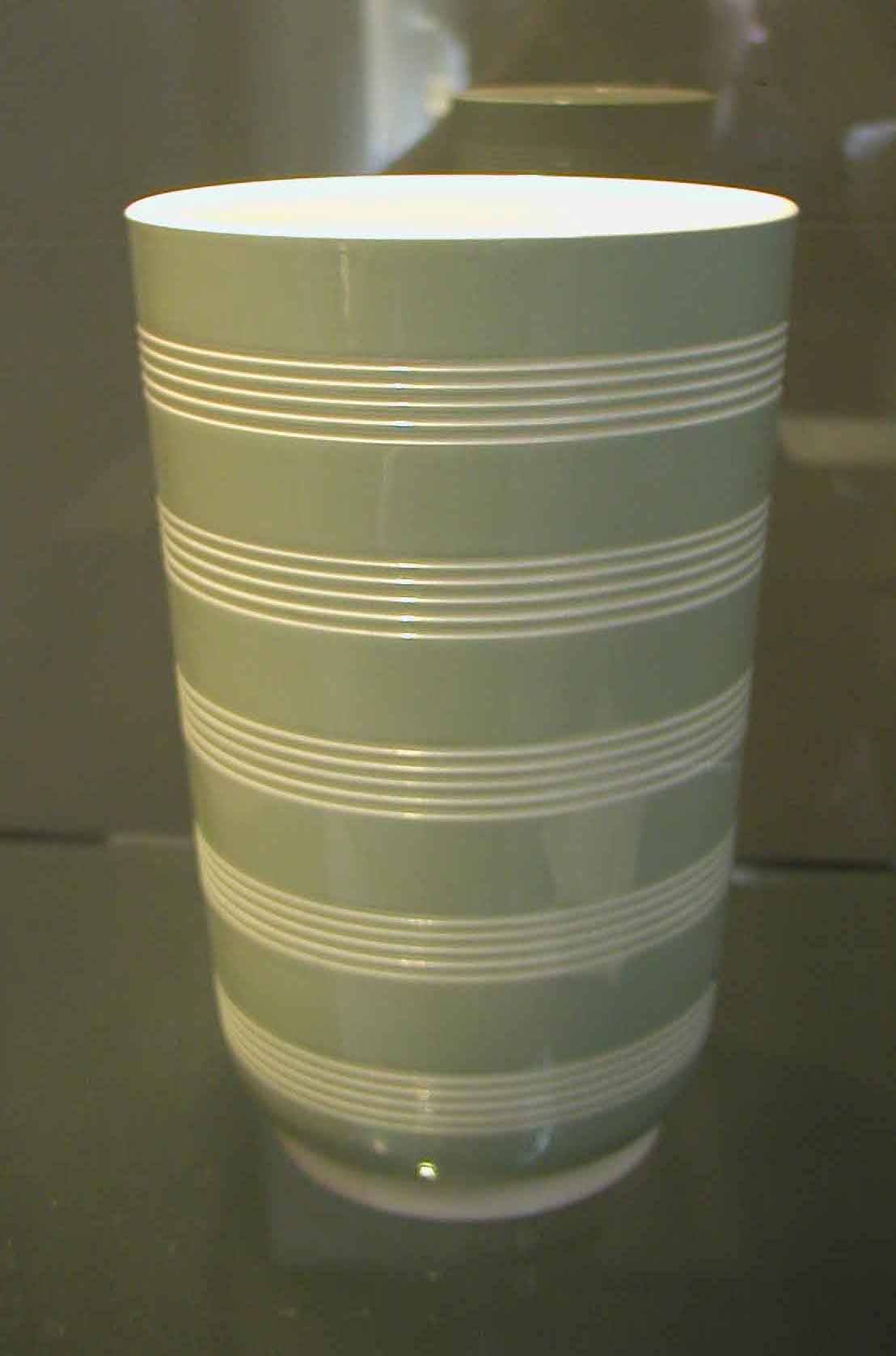
Wedgwood vase

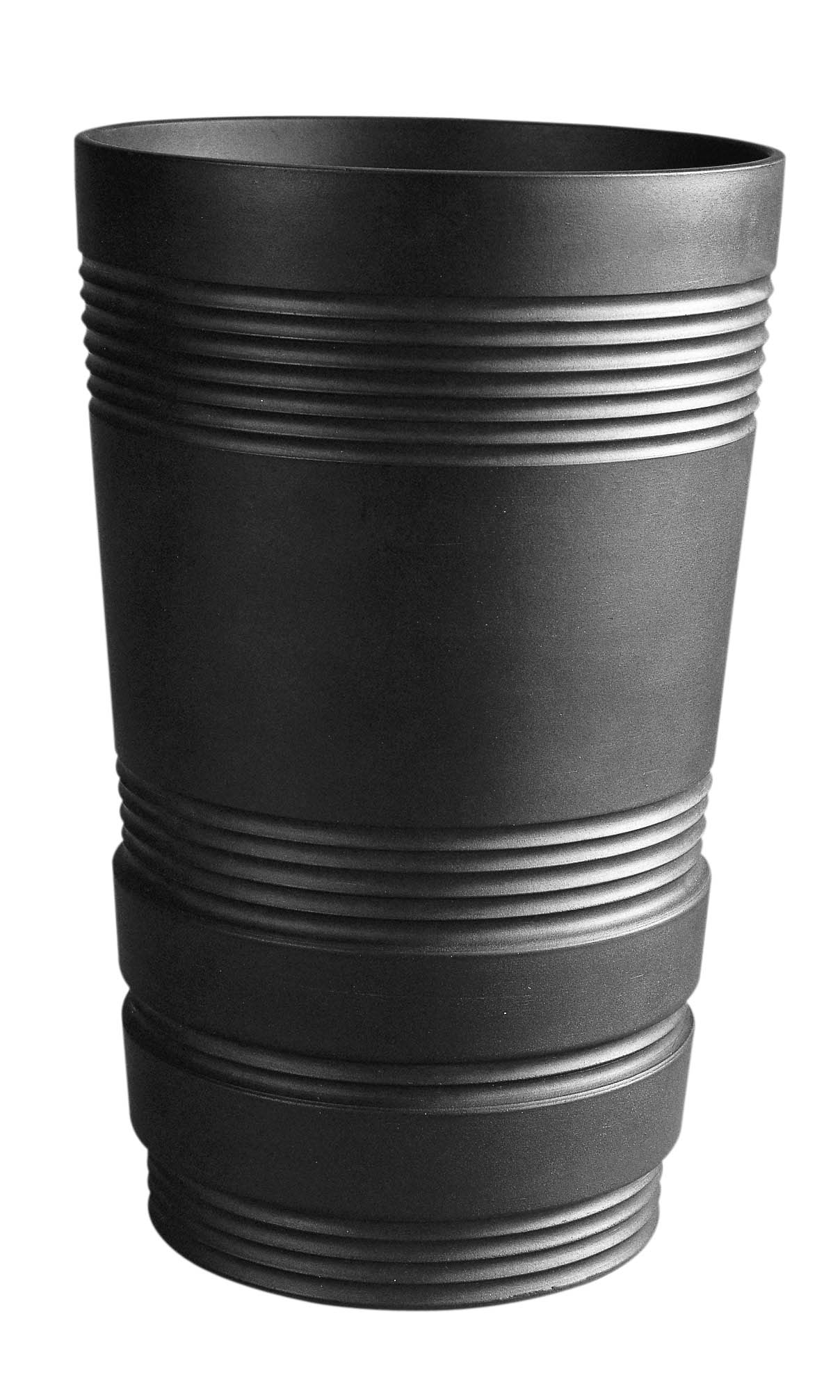
Basalt ware vase for Josiah Wedgwood and Sons Ltd

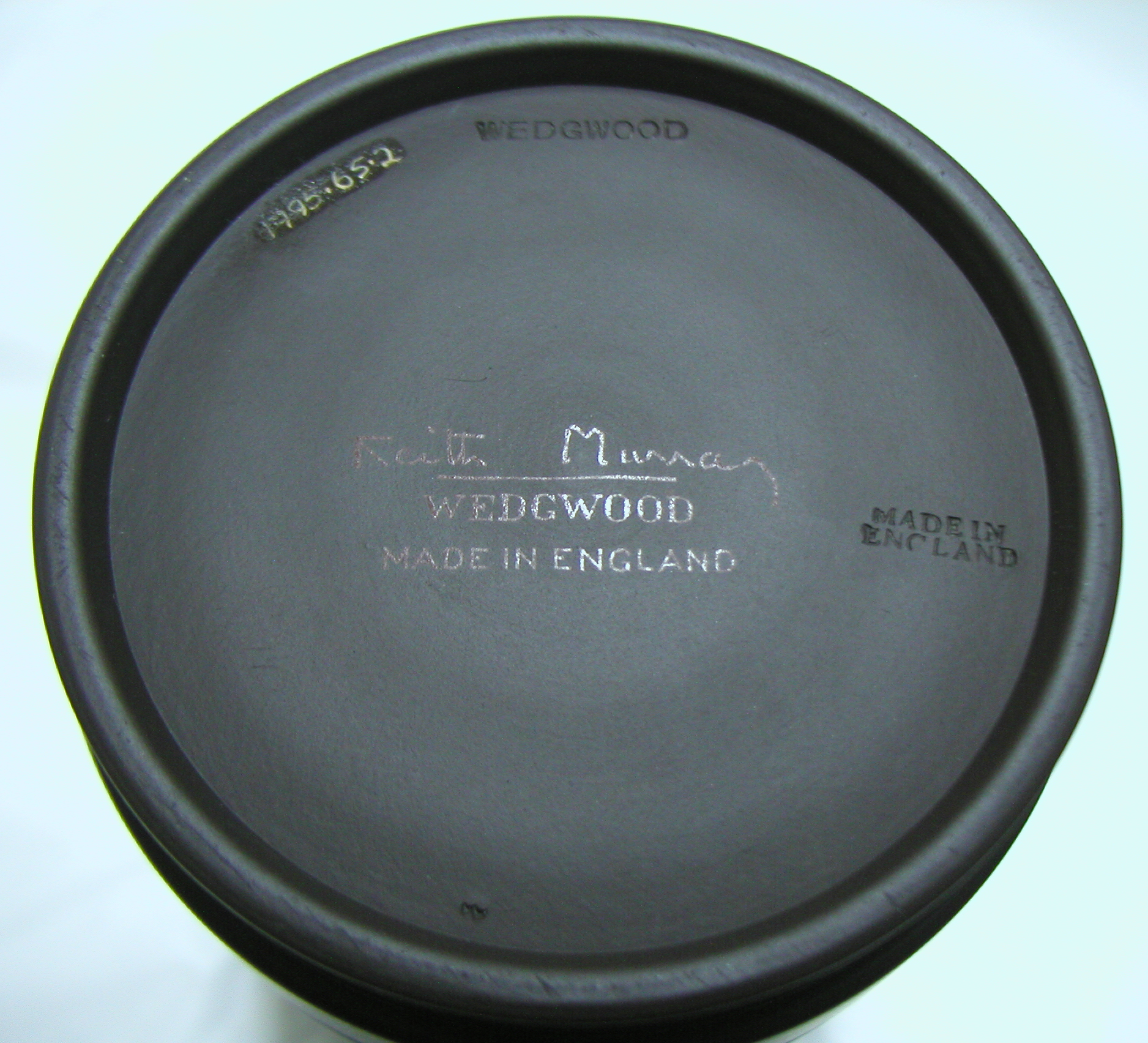
Murray's signature on the base of the vase

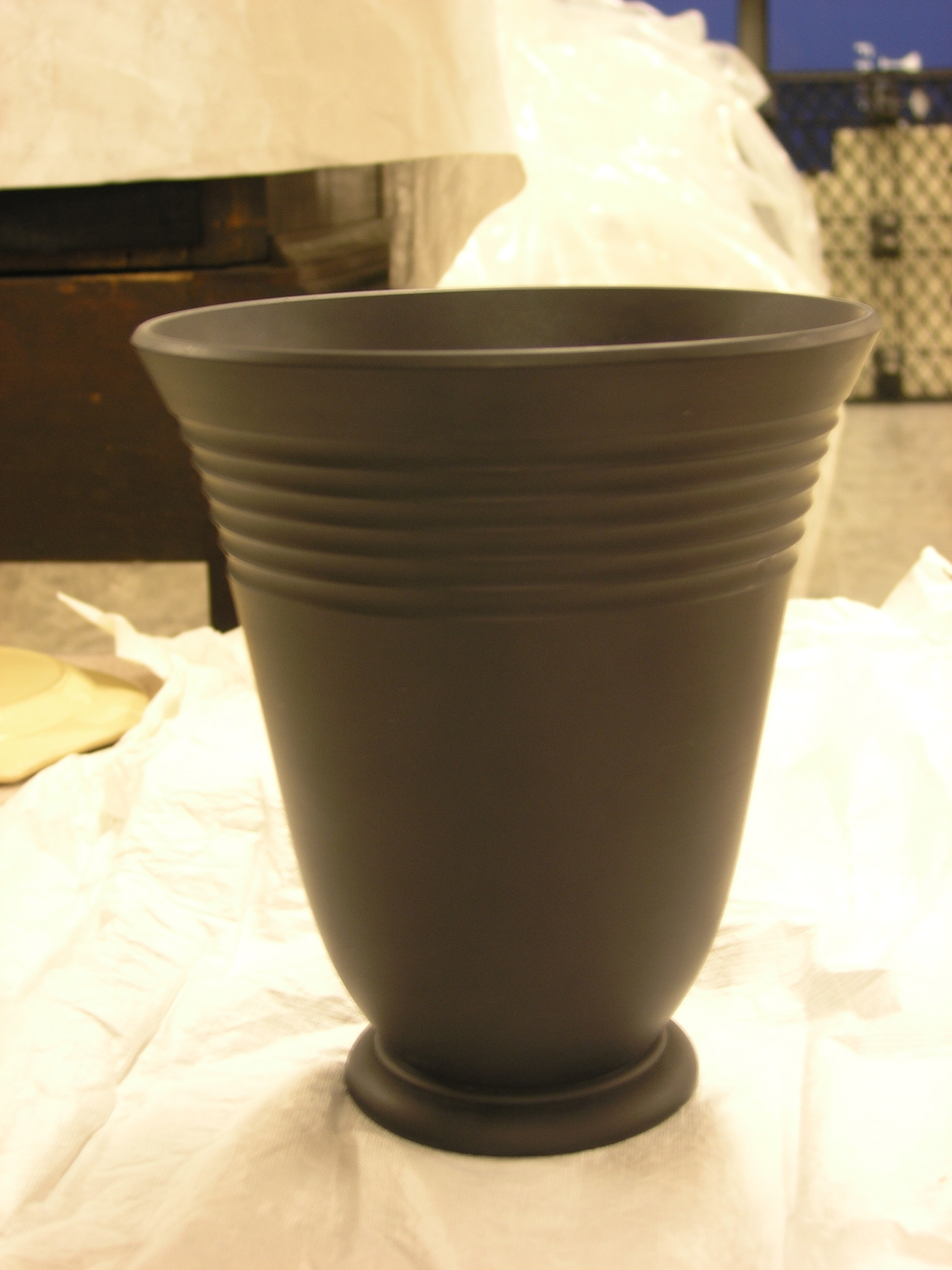
Wedgwood vase, c. 1935

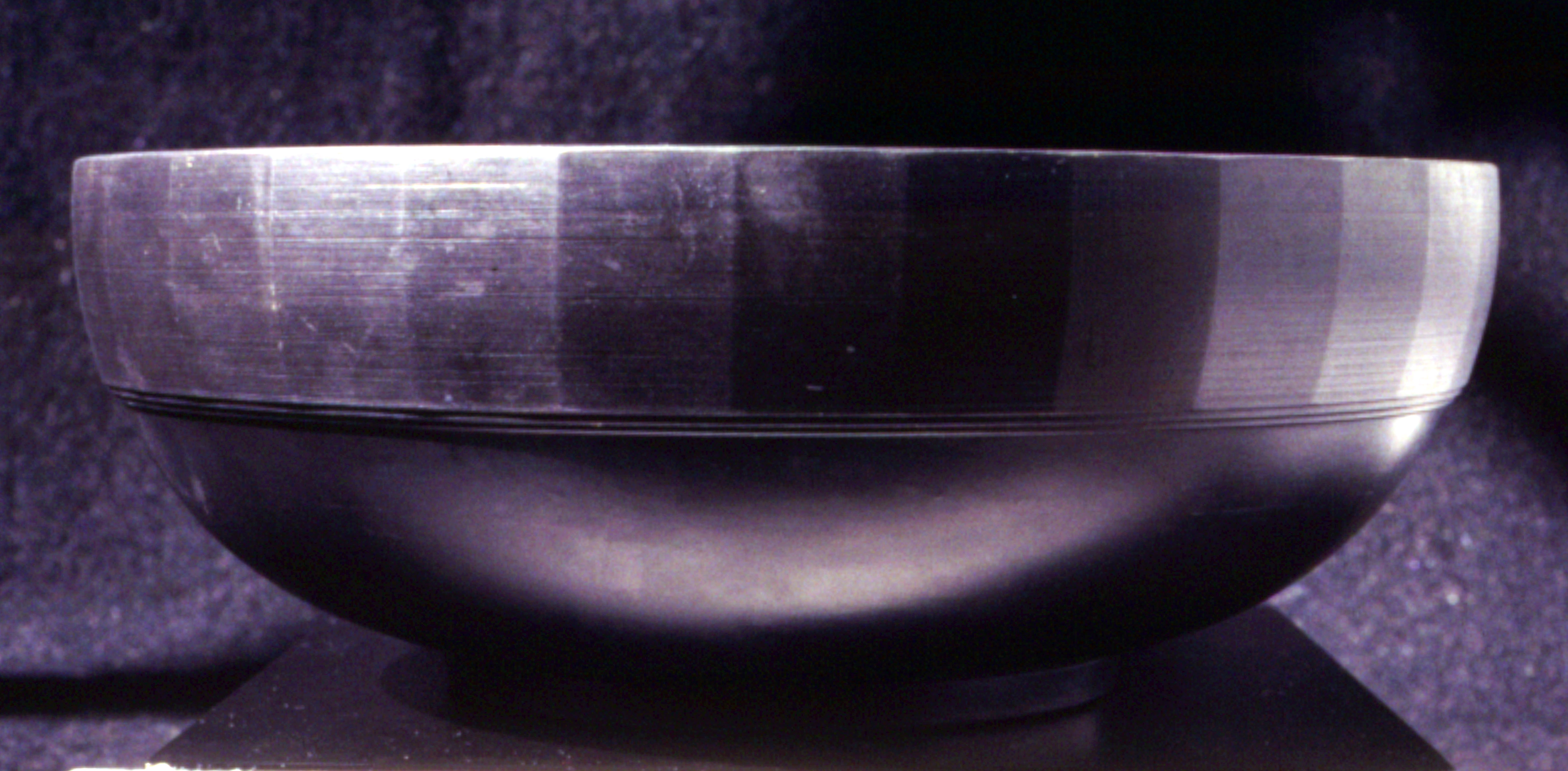
Black basalt ware bowl for Josiah Wedgwood and Sons Ltd, c. 1938

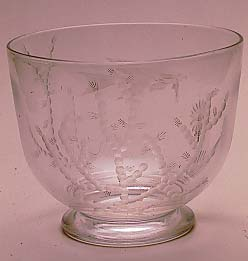
Engraved glass bowl for Stevens & Williams, c. 1931–1939

== List of works ==
- Murray, Keith (June 1925). "Studies in Madiera". The Architectural Review. Vol. 57, no. 343. pp. 222–227.
- Murray, Keith (June 1933). "The Designer and His Problem II: The Design of Table Glass". Design for To-day. pp. 53–56.
- Murray, Keith D. P. (1935). "II.—Some Views of a Designer". Journal of the Society of Glass Technology. 19 (73): 10–17.
- Works by Keith Murray from the collection of Museum of New Zealand Te Papa Tongarewa
- Works by Keith Murray from the collection of the Powerhouse Museum, Sydney, Australia

== See also ==
- Clarice Cliff
- Susie Cooper
- Charlotte Rhead
- Truda Carter
