= Alfred Meakin =

Alfred Meakin may refer to:

- Alfred Meakin (potter) founder and owner of pottery company
  - Alfred Meakin Ltd English pottery manufacturing company, affiliated with J. & G. Meakin
- Alf Meakin (born 1938), British sprinter
