= Norman Carling =

Norman Carling (1902–1971) was an English designer/modeller in ceramics, who created a large number of Art Deco models and joined Maling pottery in 1935 from the firm of A.J. Wilkinson, a company which also employed Clarice Cliff. He was responsible for Maling's classic 1930s art deco design called "Blossom Time". Carling was one of a talented design team working for Maling in the 1930s, the other two being Miss Theo Maling and Lucien George Boullemier.

Carling also introduced designs in relief to Maling's patterns, giving a tactile effect to floral depictions. Maling's art deco lustre ware is prized for its iridescent sheen.

Carling left Maling in 1946 and set up a new business Plasta Crafts in collaboration with the engraver Cecil Parker.
