= Clayburn =

Clayburn may refer to:

== Places ==
=== Canada ===
- Clayburn, Abbotsford, British Columbia, a former company town
- Abbotsford-Clayburn, former provincial British Columbia electoral district

== Other ==
- Clayburn Pottery, former English pottery company
