= Richard Barnfield =

English poet (1574–1620)

- Born: Norbury, Staffordshire, England
- Baptised: 29 June 1574
- Died: 1620 (aged 45–46)
- Occupation: Poet

Richard Barnfield (baptized 29 June 1574 – 1620) was an English poet. His relationship with William Shakespeare has long made him interesting to scholars. It has been suggested that he was the "rival poet" mentioned in Shakespeare's sonnets.

== Early life ==
Barnfield was born at the home of his maternal grandparents in Norbury, Staffordshire, where he was baptized on 29 June 1574. He was the son of Richard Barnfield, gentleman, and Mary Skrymsher (1552–1581).

He was brought up in Shropshire at The Manor House in Edgmond, his upbringing supervised by his aunt Elizabeth Skrymsher after his mother died when Barnfield was six years old.

In November 1589, Barnfield matriculated at Brasenose College, Oxford, and took his degree in February 1592. He performed the exercise for his master's gown, but seems to have left the university abruptly, without proceeding to the M.A. It is conjectured that he came up to London in 1593, and became acquainted with Watson, Drayton, and perhaps with Edmund Spenser. The death of Sir Philip Sidney had occurred while Barnfield was still a school-boy, but it seems to have strongly affected his imagination and to have inspired some of his earliest verses.

== Publications ==
In November 1594, in his twenty-first year, Barnfield published anonymously his first work, The Affectionate Shepherd, dedicated with familiar devotion to Penelope Rich, Lady Rich. This was a sort of florid romance, in two books of six-line stanzas, in the manner of Lodge and Shakespeare, dealing at large with the complaint of Daphnis for the love of Ganymede. As the author expressly admitted later, it was an expansion or paraphrase of Virgil's second eclogue Formosum pastor Corydon ardebat Alexin.

Although the poem was successful, it did not pass without censure from the moral point of view because of its openly homosexual content. Two months later, in January 1595, Barnfield published his second volume, Cynthia, with certain Sonnets, and the legend of Cassandra, and this time signed the preface, which was dedicated, in terms which imply close personal relations, to William Stanley, 6th Earl of Derby. In the preface Barnfield distances himself from the homoeroticism of his previous work, writing that some readers "did interpret The Affectionate Shepherd otherwise than in truth I meant, touching the subject thereof, to wit, the love of a shepherd to a boy". He excuses himself by saying he was imitating Virgil. The new collection, however, also contained poems which were "explicitly and unashamedly homoerotic, full of physical desire", in the words of critics Stanley Wells and Paul Edmondson. The book exemplifies the earliest study both of Spenser and Shakespeare. Cynthia itself, a panegyric on Queen Elizabeth, is written in the Spenserian stanza, of which it is probably the earliest example extant outside The Faerie Queene. The last piece in the collection tells the story of the mythical Trojan prophetess Cassandra, who in Barnfield's poem, falls in love with Agamemnon after he sexually assaults her, and is then forced by Clytemnestra and Aegisthus to eat his corpse before facing her death.

In 1598, Barnfield published his third volume, The Encomion of Lady Pecunia, a poem in praise of money, followed by a sort of continuation, in the same six-line stanza, called The Complaint of Poetry for the Death of Liberality. In this volume there is already a decline in poetic quality. But an appendix of Poems in diverse Humours to this volume of 1598 presents some very interesting features. Here appears what seems to be the absolutely earliest praise of Shakespeare in a piece entitled A Remembrance of some English Poets, in which the still unrecognized author of Venus and Adonis is celebrated by the side of Spenser, Daniel and Drayton. Here also are the sonnet, If Music and sweet Poetrie agree, and the ode beginning As it fell upon a day, which were once attributed to Shakespeare himself.

In 1599, The Passionate Pilgrim was published, with the words "By W. Shakespeare" on the title-page. It was long supposed that this attribution was correct, but Barnfield claimed one of the two pieces just mentioned, not only in 1598, but again in 1605. It is certain that both are his, and possibly other things in The Passionate Pilgrim also; Shakespeare's share in the twenty poems of that miscellany being doubtless confined to the five short pieces which have been definitely identified as his.

He was for a long time neglected, but a less homophobic age has been kinder to his reputation. The sonnet sequence, in particular, can be read as one of the more obviously homoerotic sequences of the period. His work once passed for that of Shakespeare, albeit for only one ode. The Affectionate Shepheard and the Sonnets appeared as limited-edition artist's books in 1998 and 2001, illustrated by Clive Hicks-Jenkins and produced by the Old Stile Press.

Barnfield's Lady Pecunia and The Complaint of Poetry were used as sample texts by the early 17th-century phonetician Robert Robinson for his invented phonetic script.

== Later life ==
In 1605, his Lady Pecunia was reprinted, and this was his last appearance as a man of letters. Some sources have claimed that Barnfield married and withdrew to his estate of Dorlestone (a locality in Staffordshire now known as Darlaston), where he thenceforth resided as a country gentleman. This is allegedly supported by records of a will for a Richard Barnfield, resident at Darlaston who was buried in the parish church of St Michaels, Stone, on 6 March 1627. However, it now appears that the Barnfield in question was in fact the poet's father, the poet having died in 1620 in Shropshire.
