= Maling pottery =

Maling pottery was produced in the north east of England for just over two centuries. The name of the pottery derives from the French surname of Malin. The family were Protestant Huguenots who fled their native land in the sixteenth century to escape the threat of religious persecution. They settled in England and prospered in a variety of business enterprises including coal, shipping and timber. Somewhere over the centuries the name was anglicized by the addition of a final "g".

Reproduction plate - souvenir of an exhibition of Maling ware and history, 1998. Made by Blakeney Pottery, as Maling were no longer in business.

The pottery was founded at North Hylton, Sunderland in 1762, and transferred to Newcastle upon Tyne in 1817.

Increasing business allowed the Maling family to build two further potteries, each bigger than its predecessor. The last of these occupied a fourteen acre site, and was claimed by Maling to be the biggest pottery in Britain.

== Early years ==
Little is known about the pottery’s output for the first fifty years, as pieces do not carry any form of identification. Museum pieces with known provenance suggest that Maling wares were little different from those being produced by other local potteries at the time.

When the business moved to Newcastle in 1817 the then owner, Robert Maling (son of Christopher Thompson Maling I), began to mark pieces with his name. The output seems to have been mainly simple, domestic wares made for use by the local working people. Their interest lies more in the fact that they have survived, rather in any exceptional quality of potting or decoration.

== Victorian era ==
It was Robert Maling’s son, Christopher Thompson Maling II, who took the business in a new and profitable direction in the 1850s. He devised a way to make pottery containers by machine, rather than by hand. This speeded up the production process and led to huge orders from manufacturers of goods as diverse as marmalade, meat and fish pastes, ointments and printing ink.

A Victorian visitor to the pottery records that he saw an estimated one million jars in storage, waiting to be shipped to a marmalade manufacturer. Given the size of Britain’s territorial ambition in those days, these jars can still be dug up in many parts of the world. Usually they originate from Keillers of Dundee.

By the 1890s, Maling had decided to go up market. They employed their first in-house designer and imported porcelain from other factories which they decorated and sold on under their own name. Within a few years the quality of Maling ware was such that it was being sold by stores as prestigious as Harrods of London.

== 20th century ==
In 1908, with the sale of the packaging goods still buoyant, Maling introduced a new trading name for their decorative wares. This was Cetem – being a phonetic abbreviation of CT Maling and Sons. The following three decades were to be Maling’s heyday.

A succession of designers was employed to take the pottery from the years of post-Victorian elegance through to Art Deco exuberance. By the 1920s Maling was producing over two hundred new designs a year in a successful attempt to meet the changing tastes of the British public. Many of these designs were from the hand of the father and son team Lucien Emile and Lucien George Boullemier. Both had been recruited from the Staffordshire potteries.

1924 saw the reintroduction of the Maling name which was used simultaneously with Cetem until the latter was dropped in the early 1930s.

By the outbreak of war, the Maling family members who had been directly involved in running the pottery were deceased and the business was in the hands of trustees. The war itself proved a further blow, as many skilled workers were called up for military service. Maling survived by producing items for the armed forces, such as photographic developing trays for use on RAF reconnaissance missions.

== Post-war ==
After the war the pottery came into the hands of new owners, the Hoult family, who still own the site today and regularly welcome collectors. Although investment was made, the scale of operations was reduced, with fewer staff having to put up with a downsized working area. In a slow spiral of decline fewer new patterns were introduced and fewer products sold.

Eventually, competition from more modern and streamlined potteries caused Maling to close in 1963. In two centuries it had produced over 16,500 patterns. Items ranged from simple kitchen wares such as pudding basins to highly gilded, lustred and enamelled pieces for display in fashionable homes.

== See also ==
- Norman Carling
