= A.J. Wilkinson =

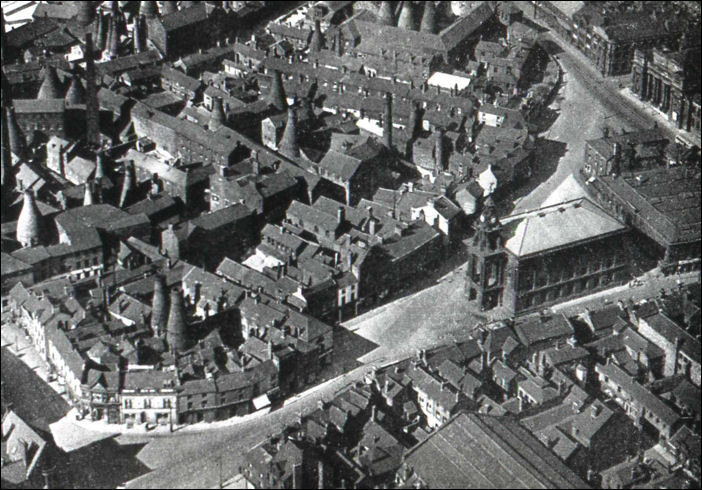
Central Works in Burslem

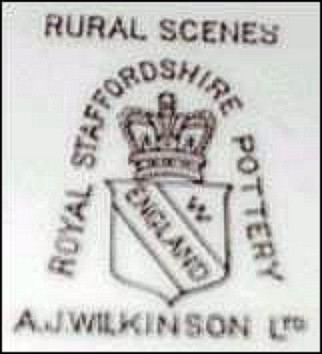

A.J. Wilkinson (Arthur J. Wilkinson, Royal Staffordshire Pottery) was a pottery or potbank at Newport in Burslem, owned by the Shorter family since 1894. A sprawling complex of bottle ovens, kilns and production shops, it lay beside the Trent and Mersey Canal, the artery which provided it with coal and the raw materials for earthenware. In its heyday it employed 400 manual workers.

== History ==
The pottery had formerly been operated in turn by Hopkin & Vernon, Hulme & Booth, Thomas Hulme, Burgess & Leigh, and Richard Alcock, who enlarged the works extensively. On Alcock's death in 1881, the owners became Wilkinson & Hulme and in 1885 to Arthur J. Wilkinson.

The works at first produced earthenware for the home market, but later operations concentrated on white graniteware for the United States. Wilkinson introduced gold lustre on graniteware. In about 1896 A. J. Wilkinson took over the Royal Staffordshire Pottery in Burslem.

The pottery was managed by Colley Shorter, an affluent Victorian, and his brother Guy. Colley, whose full name was Arthur Colley Austin Shorter (1882–1963), moved in exclusive circles and had a taste for antiques and fine furnishings. His second wife was the ceramic designer Clarice Cliff.

In 1920 Business had expanded so much, that the firm of A.J. Wilkinson was able to take over another neighbouring pottery which came to be known as the Newport Pottery Co.

In 1964 The factory was sold to Midwinter.

== Bibliography ==
- The Shorter Connection: A.J.Wilkinson, Clarice Cliff, Crown Devon - A Family Pottery, 1874-1974 - Irene Hopwood & Gordon Hopwood
