= Charlotte Rhead =

English ceramics designer (1885–1947)

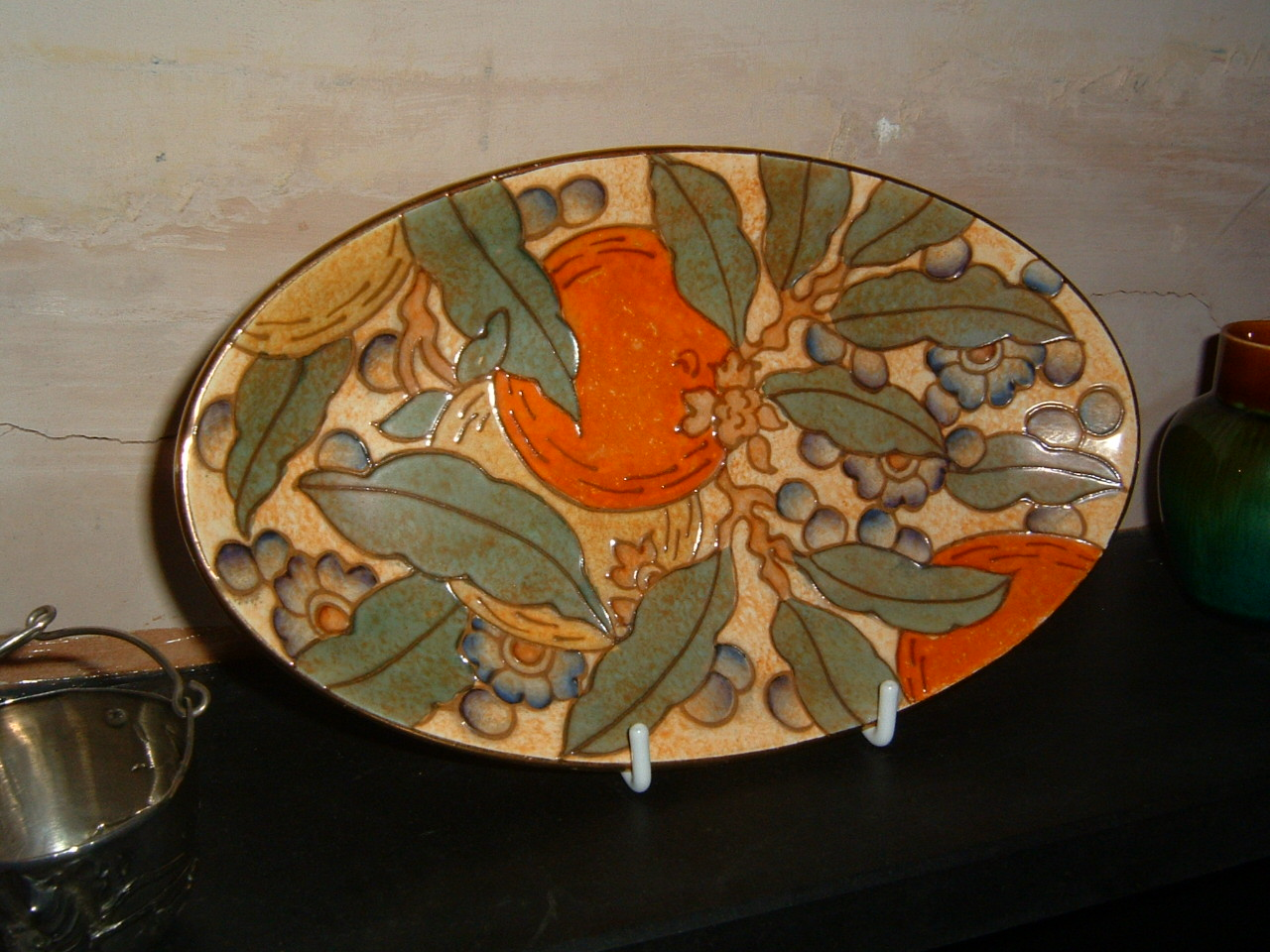
A plate by Charlotte Rhead.

Charlotte Rhead (19 October 1885 in Burslem – 6 November 1947) was an English ceramics designer active in the 1920s and the 1930s in the Potteries area of Staffordshire.

Charlotte Rhead was born into an artistic family. Her father Frederick Alfred Rhead began his career as an apprentice at Mintons where he learnt the art of pâte-sur-pâte ceramic decoration from Marc-Louis Solon. Frederick A. Rhead went on to work at a number of potteries including a failed venture of his own. Charlotte's mother Adolphine (née Hurten) also came from an artistic family. Charlotte's elder brother, Frederick Hurten Rhead, became a well-known pottery designer in the USA.

== Career ==
At the beginning of the twentieth century the Rhead family was living in Fenton where Charlotte and her sister Dollie studied at Fenton School of Art. Charlotte started work at Wardle and Co, a pottery in the nearby town of Hanley, where her brother Frederick was art director before emigrating to the USA in 1902. Charlotte did not stay at the firm long but it gave her the opportunity to develop her skills as a tubeliner, which would be useful to her in her future career as a designer. In 1905 Charlotte found employment as an enameller at Keeling & Co of Burslem. She was next employed as a designer at a tile-maker, T & R Boote. In 1912 Charlotte's father was appointed art director of Wood and Sons, a firm which operated several potteries. Charlotte joined him there, taking charge of the tubeliners, and later working as a designer. Charlotte is perhaps best known for her association with Burgess and Leigh of Middleport, where she worked as a designer from 1926 until 1931. (Their factory is still operating, as of 2026, as the Burleigh Pottery). In the 1930s she moved to the firm of AG Richardson in Tunstall. Their brand name was Crown Ducal.

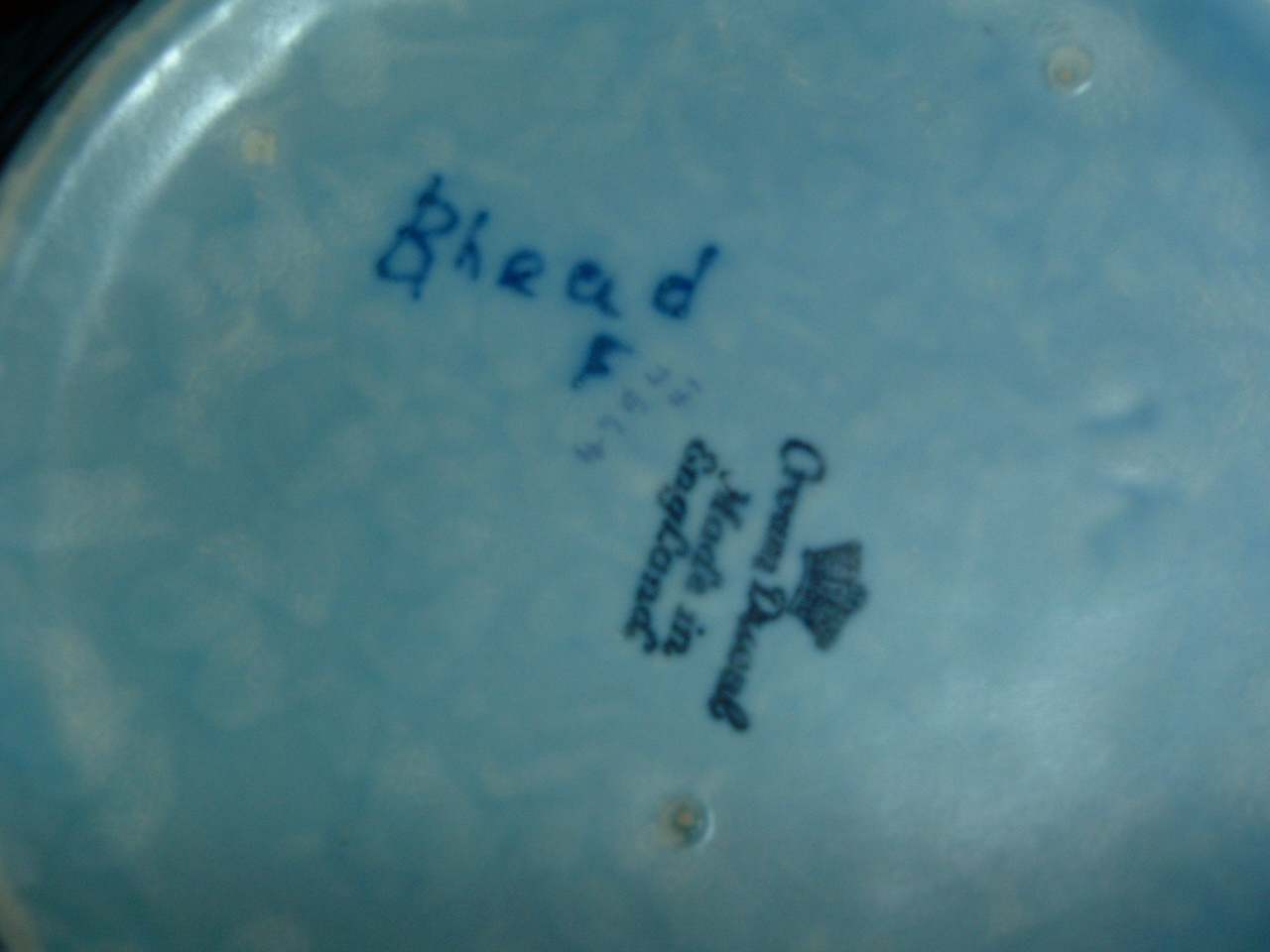
Charlotte Rhead's potter's mark.

== Death and legacy ==
She died in Wolstanton unmarried on 6 November 1947 at her home.

Rhead is noted for her cheerful tubelined designs. Her style was more traditional than that of Clarice Cliff and Susie Cooper, her contemporaries. Rhead's ware was popular in her lifetime, and continues to fetch moderate prices at auction. Jessie Tait, another prolific ceramic designer, worked for Charlotte Rhead.

The leading authority on the Rhead family was Bernard Bumpus (1921–2004) who curated an exhibition about the Rhead family, Rhead Artists and Potters, which toured various UK museums in the 1980s. Bumpus's publications include Charlotte Rhead: Potter and Designer, 1987.

== Media attention ==
In 1985 Rhead, Clarice Cliff, and Susie Cooper were the subject of Pottery Ladies, a series of TV documentaries made for Channel 4 with the support of the Arts Council of Great Britain. Susie Cooper was the only one of the three who was still alive by this time, but one of the 25-minute programmes includes interviews with paintresses and tubeliners who worked with Rhead.

== See also ==
- Clarice Cliff
- Susie Cooper
- Truda Carter
- Keith Murray (ceramic artist)
