= Robert Robinson (phonetician) =

English phonetician

- Born: c. 1600s
- Occupations: Phonetician; Schoolmaster
- Known for: The Art of Pronuntiation; Created his own phonetic alphabet

Robert Robinson was an English phonetician living in London in the early 17th century who created his own phonetic alphabet and wrote The Art of Pronuntiation.

== Biography ==
Almost nothing is known about Robinson's life. He was relatively young, according to his own account, in 1617, and therefore may have been born not long before 1600. He may also have survived past 1660, earning a living as a schoolmaster.

== Works ==
His only known published work is The Art of Pronuntiation, a handbook of English phonetics, published in 1617, and apparently a poor seller, as only one copy survives, in Oxford's Bodleian Library.

The Art of Pronuntiation contains two parts. The first Vox Audienda, attempts in a very elementary and far from satisfactory way to give an account of the sounds of English in articulatory terms. The second, Vox Videnda is more interesting, as it sets forth an ingenious, if occasionally defective, alphabet to represent these sounds. Unlike other attempts at a phonetic English character (such as that of Alexander Gil), Robinson's alphabet breaks entirely free from the basis of the Roman alphabet, using characters that bear only an accidental resemblance to Roman letters, while having a systematic relation to each other.

Robinson's alphabet is not only phonetic but to some extent featural, as voicing is not represented on the letters themselves, but by means of diacritics, in a mode that takes some account of assimilative voicing and devoicing of consonant clusters; English stress accent is also indicated by diacritics. Nasal stops are marked by a modification of the letters representing oral stops.

Included in The Art of Pronuntiation is Robinson's transcription of a Latin poem (presumably of his own composition), which exemplifies the idiosyncratic pronunciation used in English Latin schools of his time — and also, with sound-changes concurrent with those taking place in English, down to the 19th century, and thus provides valuable evidence as to the traditional adaptation of Latin to English phonology.

== Unpublished works ==
Even more significant than Robinson's published work, however, is his transcription (unpublished in his lifetime) of several poems by Richard Barnfield into this alphabet. These transcriptions provide very valuable evidence as to the pronunciation of English in Robinson's time; a pronunciation which, perhaps due to Robinson's youth or place of origin, contains many features that are more modern than Gil's, and which exemplify (even within a single text) several contemporary changes occurring in the pronunciation of English.

== Robinson's phonetics ==
Robinson distinguishes ten vowels in English, which he clearly considers to be distinct in quality as well as length. The long vowels are implied to be midway in quality between the neighbouring short vowels. In his alphabet, however, he treats them as pairs, with the long vowels being in shape inverted forms of the short vowels. Although interpretation of his symbolism is necessary, very approximately his vowels can be assigned as follows:

- First pair: Short [ʊ] Long [oː]
- Second pair: Short [ɔ] Long [ɒː]
- Third pair: Short [ɐ] Long [aː]
- Fourth pair: Short [ɛ] Long [eː]
- Fifth pair: Short [ɪ] Long [iː] or [ij] (according to Robinson, "almost extended to the inward place of the consonants")

Representative words are:

1. [lʊv] "love" (ModE [lʌv]), [ɹoːz] "rose" (ModE [ɹoʊz])
2. [hɔt] "hot" (ModE [hɒt]), [kɒːz] "cause" (ModE [kɔːz])
3. [sɐd] "sad" (ModE [sæd]), [naːm] "name" (ModE [neɪm])
4. [bɛst] "best" (ModE [bɛst]), [pleːz] "please" (ModE [pliːz])
5. [ɾɪtʃ] "rich" (ModE [ɹɪtʃ]), [kwiːn] "queen" (ModE [kwiːn])

The vowel assignments must be taken as extremely approximate, better reflecting the relationships between the vowels than their precise sound.

Robinson's diphthongs are:

- [ɐi] or perhaps [ai] in [plɐin] / [plain]) "plain" (ModE [pleɪn]). This sound was in process of merging with [aː] (e.g. "day" both [dɐi] and [daː], "against" both [aɡɐinst] and [aɡaːnst]), hence the inference that it may have been [ai].
- [ɒʍ] in [θɒʍts] "thoughts" (ModE [θɔːts])
- [ɛi] in [fɛin] "fine" (ModE [faɪn])
- [ɛw] in [fɛw] "few" (ModE [fjuː], [fjʊw])
- [ɪw] in [vɪw] "view" (ModE [vjuː], [vjʊw])
- [ɔi] in [kɔin] "coin" (ModE [kɔɪn])
- [ɔw] in [ɡɾɔwnd] "ground" (ModE [ɡɹaʊnd]) but also in [sɔwl] "soul" (ModE [soʊl]) and likewise "cold", "gold", etc.
- [ʊw] in [mʊwn] "moon" (ModE [muːn], [mʊwn])

== See also ==
- List of phonetics topics
- Alexander Gil

== Sources ==
Dobson, E.J., 1957. The Phonetic Writings of Robert Robinson. Early English Text Society Vol. No. 238. Oxford University Press.

== See also ==
- Dobson, E.J., 'Robert Robinson and his phonetic transcripts of early seventeenth-century English pronunciation', Transactions of the Philological Society (1947)
- Webb, Mike, '"A Miscelany of Meditations ..." by Robert Robinson of London, 1659', The Bodleian Library Record, volume 30, numbers 1-2 (April/October 2017), pages 164-170
