= Truda Carter =

Truda Carter (1890–1958), was a designer who, alongside her first husband John Adams, was associated with the Art Deco pottery that characterized Poole Pottery during the inter-war years of the twentieth century.

== Biography ==
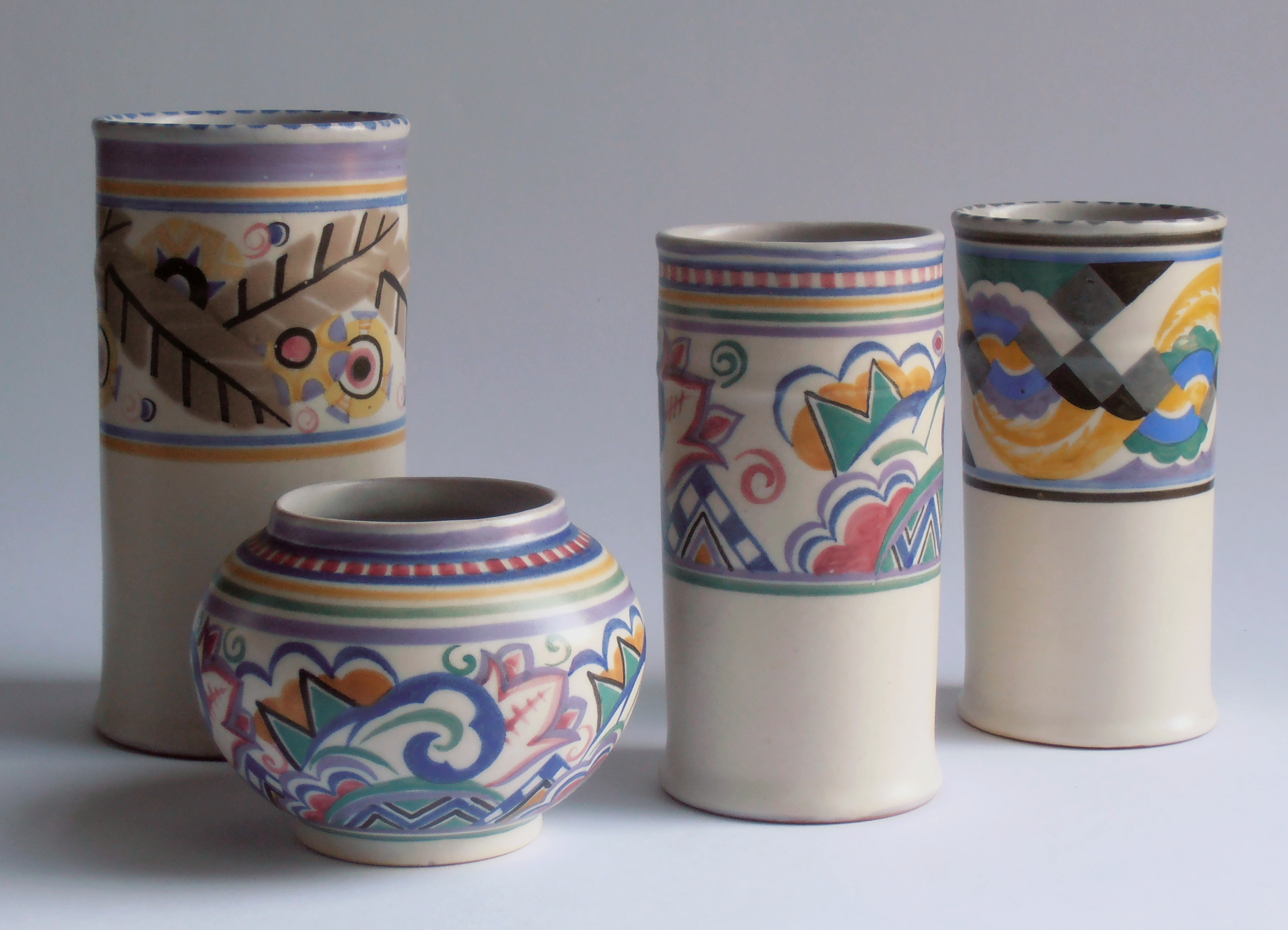
Art Deco Poole Pottery with Truda Carter Pattern

Born Gertrude Ethel Sharp, Truda was the youngest of seven children, her father being the entomologist David Sharp. Truda studied Applied Art at the Royal College of Art in London, where she met and married ceramicist John Adams in 1915. Following their marriage the couple moved to South Africa, to teach at the School of Art at Durban Technical College. There they established a pottery section at the college, and it is likely that Truda learnt much of her pottery skills from her husband during this period. Returning to Britain, Truda and John joined the pottery at Poole, Dorset, in 1921, with the formation of the new company "Carter, Stabler and Adams Ltd" by its directors Cyril Carter (who Truda was later to marry), Harold Stabler and John Adams.

Initially adapting the designs of her predecessor at Poole Pottery, James Radley Young, Carter went on to develop more complex patterns with clear influences from European Art Deco pottery and prints, as well as contemporary abstract modernist painting. Carter created the vast majority of the patterns that decorated Poole Pottery during the 1920s and '30s. It is these brightly coloured, loosely floral, abstract designs for which she is best known. Truda Carter remained resident designer at Poole Pottery until her retirement in 1950.

== See also ==
- Clarice Cliff
- Susie Cooper
- Charlotte Rhead
