= Dorlestone Hall =

Manor house in England

Coordinates: 52.9092°N 2.175°W

Dorlestone or Darlaston Hall (from 'Staffordshire Past-Track' website)

Dorlestone Hall was a manor house at Darlaston, a locality also known as Dorlestone, near Stone, Staffordshire, England, on the Trent.

The Hall was built prior to the Reformation. Prior to 1503, the Hall was leased by Jacobus Colyar, who had probably fought in Spain during the Reconquista, as he was given a letters patent with symbols of prowess in the Crusades. In 1503, the Hall was leased by his son, Robert Colyar. He became a wool trader and married Agnes Venables de Kinderton. His son, Thurston, also leased the Hall. In 1537, its ownership passed from Burton Abbey to Thurston's son, James Collier. The abbey was dissolved two years later. In 1685, a descendant, James Collier, sold the Hall to William Jervis.

The property is associated with Richard Barnfield, who is one of the candidates for Shakespeare's "Rival Poet". A "Richard Barnfield of Dorlestone in the Countie of Stafford Esquire" who died here in 1627, was formerly believed to be the poet, but current thinking is that the death recorded was that of his father whose name he shared.

In 1880 the estate was acquired by the Meakin family from the Jervis family. The house was demolished after the Second World War.
