= Clarice Cliff =

English artist

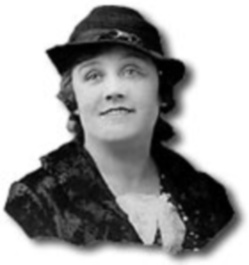
- Clarice Ciff
- Born: 20 January 1899; Tunstall, England
- Died: 23 October 1972 (aged 73); Clayton, Staffordshire, England
- Education: Royal College of Art
- Occupation: Designer
- Known for: Ceramic designs and other artworks
- Style: Art Deco
- Spouse: Arthur C A Shorter

Clarice Cliff (20 January 1899 – 23 October 1972) was an English ceramic artist and designer. Active from 1922 to 1963, Cliff became the head of the Newport Pottery factory creative department.

== Early life ==
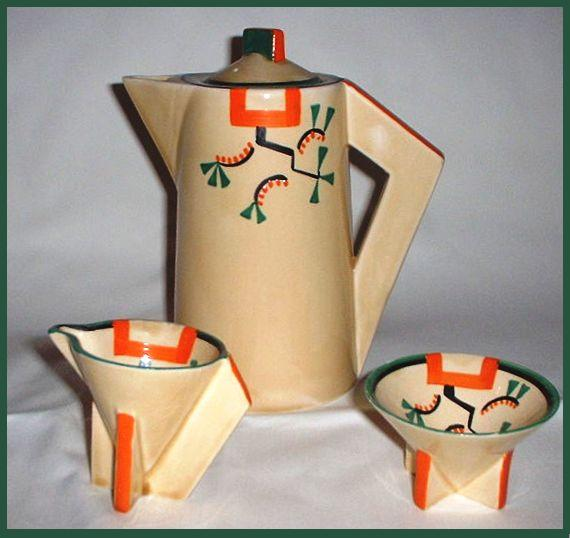
Clarice's 'Ravel' pattern on conical shape coffee pot, sugar, and cream – 1930

Cliff's ancestors moved from the Eccleshall area to Tunstall, Stoke-on-Trent, around 1725. Cliff was born on the terrace of a modest house in Meir Street on 20 January 1899. Her father, Harry Thomas Cliff, worked at an iron foundry in Tunstall. Her mother Ann (née Machin) washed clothes to supplement the family income. They had seven children.

Cliff was sent to a different school from her siblings. After school, she would visit her aunt, who was a hand-painter. She made papier-mâché models at school for a local pottery company.

At age 13, Cliff started working in the pottery industry as a gilder. She added gold lines on pottery of traditional design. Later, she learned freehand painting at another potbank. She also studied art and sculpture at the Burslem School of Art.

== Early career ==
In 1916, Cliff relocated to the factory of A.J. Wilkinson in Newport, Burslem, to increase her career opportunities. Most of the young women in the Staffordshire Potteries would continue working in the area of the task they had first mastered in order to raise their income above the rate of 'apprentice wages'. Cliff chose not to follow this traditional path; instead she acquired many skills, such as modeling figurines and vases, gilding, keeping pattern books, and hand-painting ware. Hand-painting included outlining, enameling and banding (drawing radial bands on plates or vessels). In the early 1920s, decorating manager Jack Walker brought Cliff to the attention of one of the factory owners, Arthur Colley Austin Shorter. Shorter nurtured her skills in ceramics and gave her space to explore her own ideas. He was married, but later married Cliff after his wife died (Cliff and Shorter were married in December 1940). Over time, Cliff developed her skills and studied at the Royal College of Art and visited Paris.

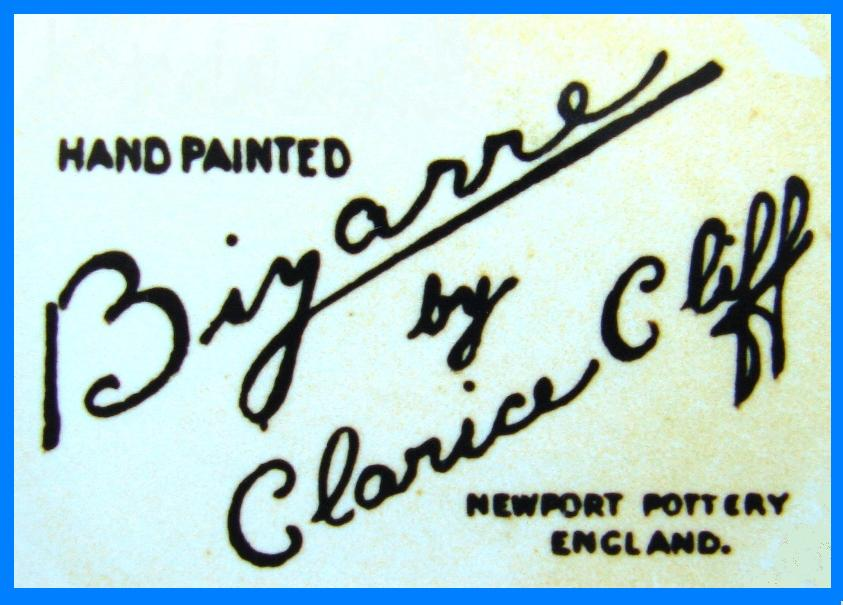
The first printed 'Bizarre' backstamp used on Clarice Cliff ware from 1928 to early 1936 in various styles.

In various styles, the first printed 'Bizarre' back stamp was used on Clarice Cliff ware from 1928 to early 1936. Cliff was given a second apprenticeship at the age of 25 (1924). She worked at A.J. Wilkinson's, primarily as a 'modeler' and worked alongside factory designers John Butler and Fred Ridgway. They produced conservative, Victorian-style ware. Eventually, Cliff's wide range of skills was recognized, and in 1927 she was given a studio at the adjoining Newport Pottery, which Arthur Colley Austin Shorter had bought in 1920. Here, Cliff was allowed to decorate some of the old defective glost ware in her freehand patterns. She used on-glaze enamel colours for these, which enabled a brighter palette than underglaze colours.

She covered the imperfections in simple patterns of triangles, in a style that she called 'Bizarre.' The earliest examples had a hand-painted mark, usually in a rust-coloured paint: 'Bizarre by Clarice Cliff," she wrote, and sometimes she added 'Newport Pottery' underneath. To the surprise of the company's senior salesman Ewart Oakes, it was immediately popular when he took a carload to a major stockist. Clarice was joined by young painter, Gladys Scarlett, who helped her with the ware. Soon, a more professional back stamp was made, which showed Cliff's facsimile signature, and proclaimed "Hand Painted Bizarre by Clarice Cliff, Newport Pottery England."

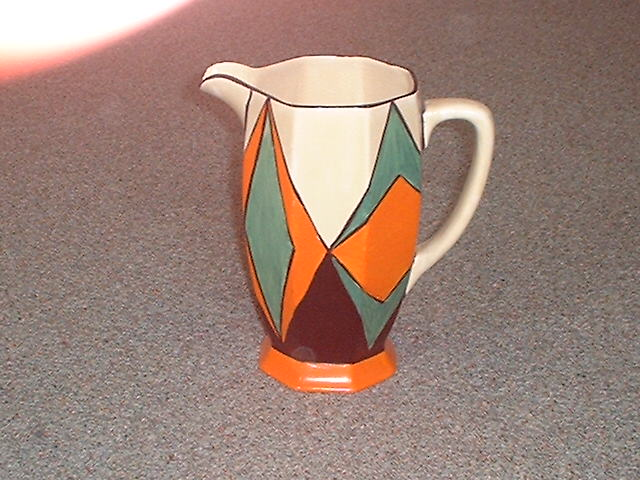
Early 'Original Bizarre' pattern on an Athens shape jug

This back stamp led to Bizarre being used as an umbrella name for her entire pattern range, so the factory had to refer to the first pieces with the simple triangles as Original Bizarre.

In March 1927 Shorter sent Cliff to the Royal College of Art in Kensington, for two brief periods of study in March and May. These dates are recorded in the Royal College of Art archive and were also remembered by Gladys Scarlett in 1982, as she was briefly left alone at Newport to paint the new 'Bizarre' ware.

Starting in 1927, Cliff was credited for shapes she designed, such as her Viking Boat flower holder, though her modeling for the factory is recorded in the trade journal only as far back as 1923–24. From 1929 onward, the shapes took on a more 'Modern' influence. They were often angular and geometric, and some got what was to be later termed Art Deco designs. Abstract and cubist patterns appeared on these shapes, such as the 1929 Ravel (seen on Cliff's Conical shape ware), which was an abstract leaf and flower pattern named after the composer. The image shows a conical coffee pot as well as a sugar bowl and cream holder with four triangular feet, another of Cliff's Bizarre shape ideas which proved popular with 1930s customers. Ravel produced between 1929 and at least as late as 1935.

In 1928, Cliff produced a simple, hand painted pattern of Crocus flowers in orange, blue and purple. Each flower was constructed with confident upward strokes and then green leaves were added by holding the piece upside down and painting thin lines amongst the flowers. The Crocus pattern was completely hand-painted, and the vibrant colors led to large sales.

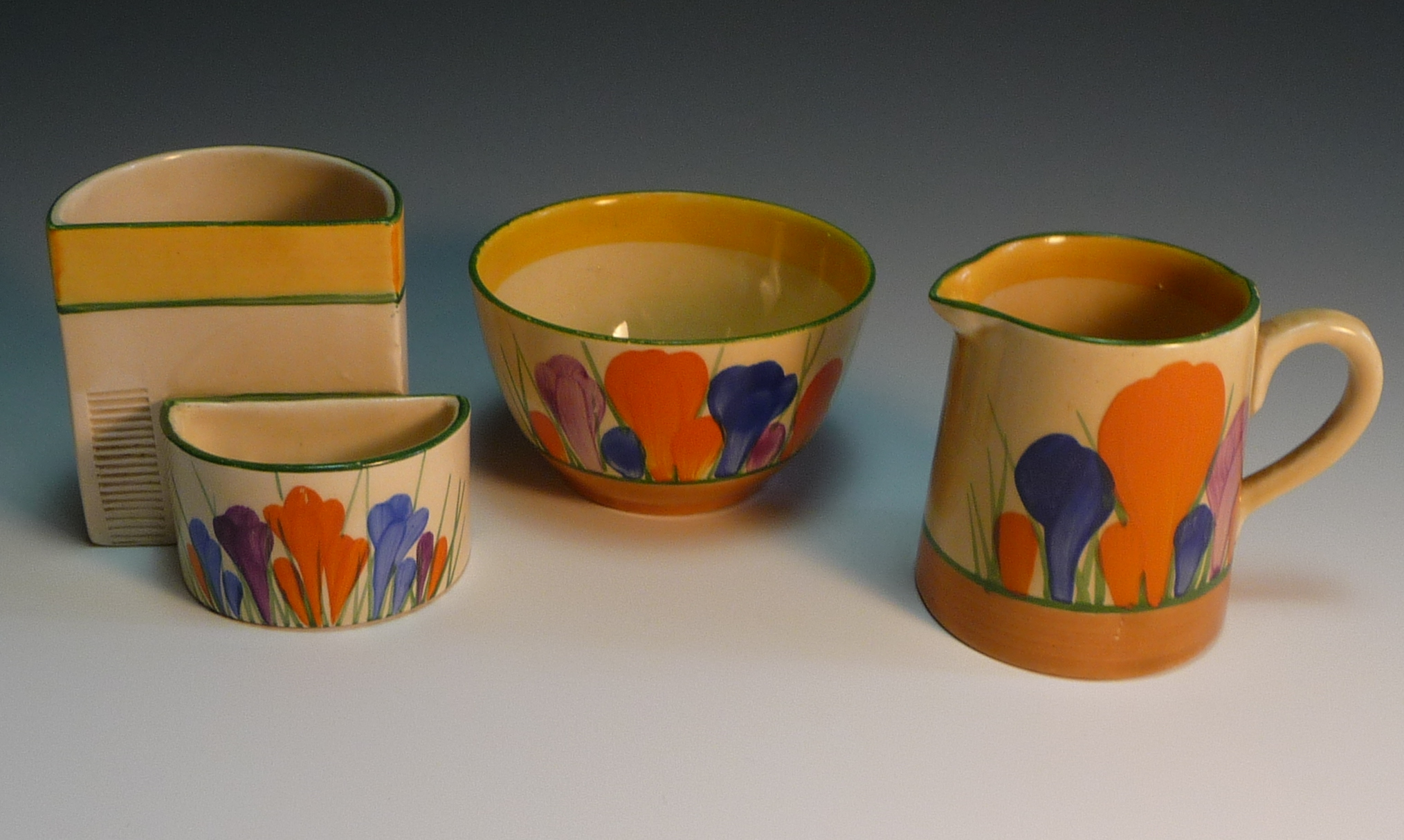
'Crocus' pattern

Initially, Cliff had just one young decorator produce Crocus, Ethel Barrow but by 1930, a separate decorating shop was established underneath the top floor of the building which housed the 'Bizarre' shop, where Ethel trained young painters on how to paint the pattern. Twenty young women painted nothing but Crocus for 5½ days a week for much of the 1930s. Crocus was unusual because it was produced on tableware, tea and coffee ware, and 'fancies' (which included novelty items made primarily as gift ware). The pattern had many colour variations, including Purple Crocus (1932), Blue Crocus (1935), Sungleam Crocus (1935), and Spring Crocus. Crocus continued to be produced after World War II, and the final pieces with Clarice Cliff marks were made in 1963. However, Midwinter bought the factory and continued to paint the pieces to order until as late as 1968.

By 1929, Cliff's decorators had grown to a team of around 70 young painters. Of those, 66 were women (called 'Bizarre girls') and 4 were boys. Many of these workers were traced in the 1980s and 1990s and they totalled over 100. Their names and work for Clarice Cliff were recorded in the centenary book.

The factory produced a series of small color printed leaflets (quite unusual for this time) which could be obtained by post, or from stockists. This promotional device was successful, and one young girl's only task was to put the leaflets in stamped self-addressed envelopes sent to the factory. At this time, many women would buy pottery by mail order picked from advertising magazines. The series of leaflets, each of which covered a range of pieces in a similar style or set of colours, included the patterns Bizarre, Fantasque, Delecia, Appliqué, Inspiration, Crocus & Gayday, but contained other design patterns as well. The original leaflet for the Appliqué patterns featured just two, Lucerne and Lugano, but Cliff's career witnessed 14 Appliqué patterns that had been designed by 1932: Avignon, Windmill, Red Tree, Idyll, Palermo, Blossom, Caravan, Bird of Paradise, Etna, Garden, Eden and Monsoon in addition to the original two.

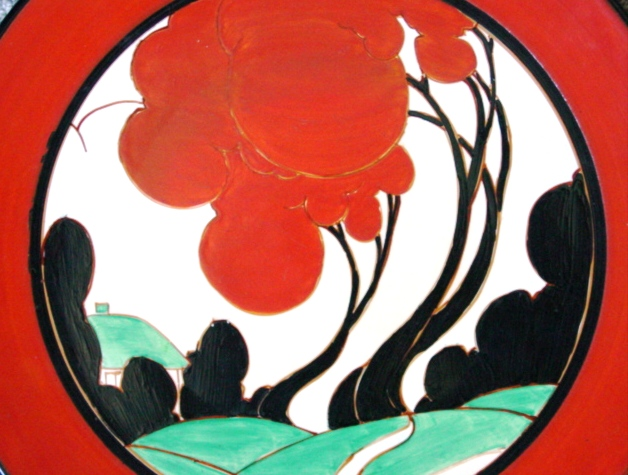
'Red Autumn' pattern 1930

The Fantasque range evolved between 1928 and 1934 and mainly featured abstracts or landscapes of cottages and trees, as well as some Art Deco inspired patterns. The first Fantasque landscape pattern was Trees and House, which sold well from 1930 until at least 1934. However, it was the slightly later, more sophisticated Autumn pattern issued near the end of 1930 which was more popular. Originally created in red, coral-green and black, from 1930 to 1931 many colourway variations appeared. The rarest is the red colourway, shown on a 13-inch (330 mm) wall plaque. The best selling version at the time was one with trees in blue, green and yellow. All these variations are collectables.

== The 1930s ==
In 1930, Cliff was appointed as art director at Newport Pottery and A. J. Wilkinson, the two adjoining factories that produced her wares. Her work involved spending more time with Colley Shorter, and this gradually developed into an affair, conducted in secrecy. The couple worked closely together on creating awareness of 'Bizarre ware' to catch the attention of buyers in the middle of a major financial depression. Colley Shorter registered Clarice's name and even some of her shapes. It was her ability to design both patterns and the shapes they were to go on that distinguished Cliff above any other designers in the Staffordshire Potteries at this time. Her first modelling in the mid 20s was of stylised figures, people, ducks, the floral embossed Davenport ware of 1925 but in 1929 at the same time as she started the colourful cubist and landscape designs, Cliff's modeling took on a new style. This was influenced by European originals by Désny, Tétard Freres, Josef Hoffmann and others, that she had seen in design journals including 'Mobilier e Décoration'.

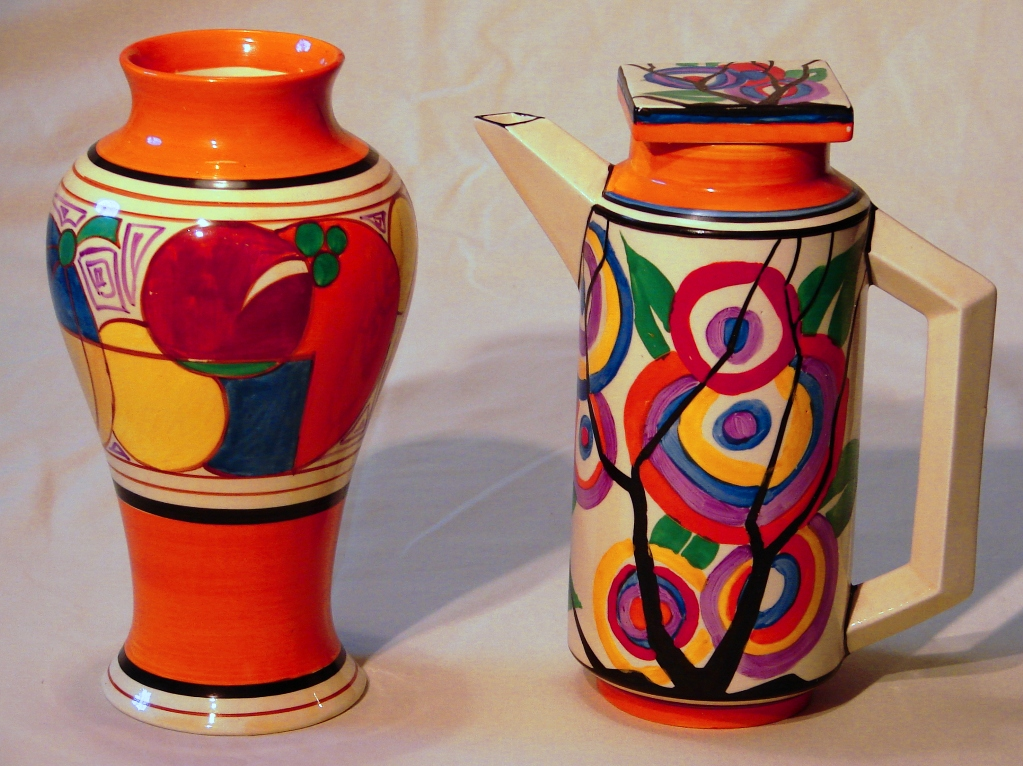
1930 patterns: Melon on a shape 14 vase, and Circle Tree on an Eton shape coffeepot

Between 1929 and 1935 Cliff issued a mass of shape ranges, including Conical (see photo below), Bon Jour/Biarritz, Stamford, Eton, Daffodil and Trieste. In each of these there were tea and coffee ware shapes, but the first two were so popular that biscuit barrels, sugar sifters, bowls and vases were issued to enlarge the range. Bon Jour had 20 shapes created during 1933, with about 10 more being added in 1934. There were also many other vases, bowls and 'fancies', such as the Liner vase, Flower tube vase and the (now rare) Lido Lady ashtray and Age of Jazz musicians and dancers.

Through the depths of the Great Depression Cliff's wares continued to sell in volume at what were high prices for the time. Her Bizarre and Fantasque ware was sold throughout North America, Australia, New Zealand, South Africa, but not in mainland Europe. In Britain many top London stores sold it, including Harrods. Some of the other London stockists have long since closed, but the list is impressive: "& Co., Lawley's, Bon Marche, John Lewis, Peter Robinson, Selfridges, John Barker & Co., Warring & Gillow and Gorringe's". However, the extant order books of the period confirm that Bizarre ware was never sold at Woolworths as some have erroneously stated.

Further vividly colored patterns, such as Melon and Circle Tree appeared in 1930. Cliff devised many ways of marketing these: in-store painting demonstrations, for which Cliff chose just the prettiest of her painters and most famously she and Shorter had the idea to actually pay major 1930s celebrities to endorse the ware. This was done both in magazine articles and by appearances at large stores. The celebrities included "actresses Adrianne Allen, Marion Lorne, Marie Tempest, the BBC presenter Christopher Stone and musical comedy star Bobby Howes". Sir Malcolm Campbell who had just broken the world land speed record appeared at a promotion at the First Avenue Hotel, London in 1930.

Cliff's worldwide impact was made clear by a story in the Pasadena Evening Post in the US. It pictured her with a five-foot-high 'horse' made entirely of Bizarre ware which had been made to promote the ware in Britain. It was in this article, that Cliff made what has become her most famous quote: "Having a little fun at my work does not make me any less of an artist, and people who appreciate truly beautiful and original creations in pottery are not frightened by innocent tomfoolery."

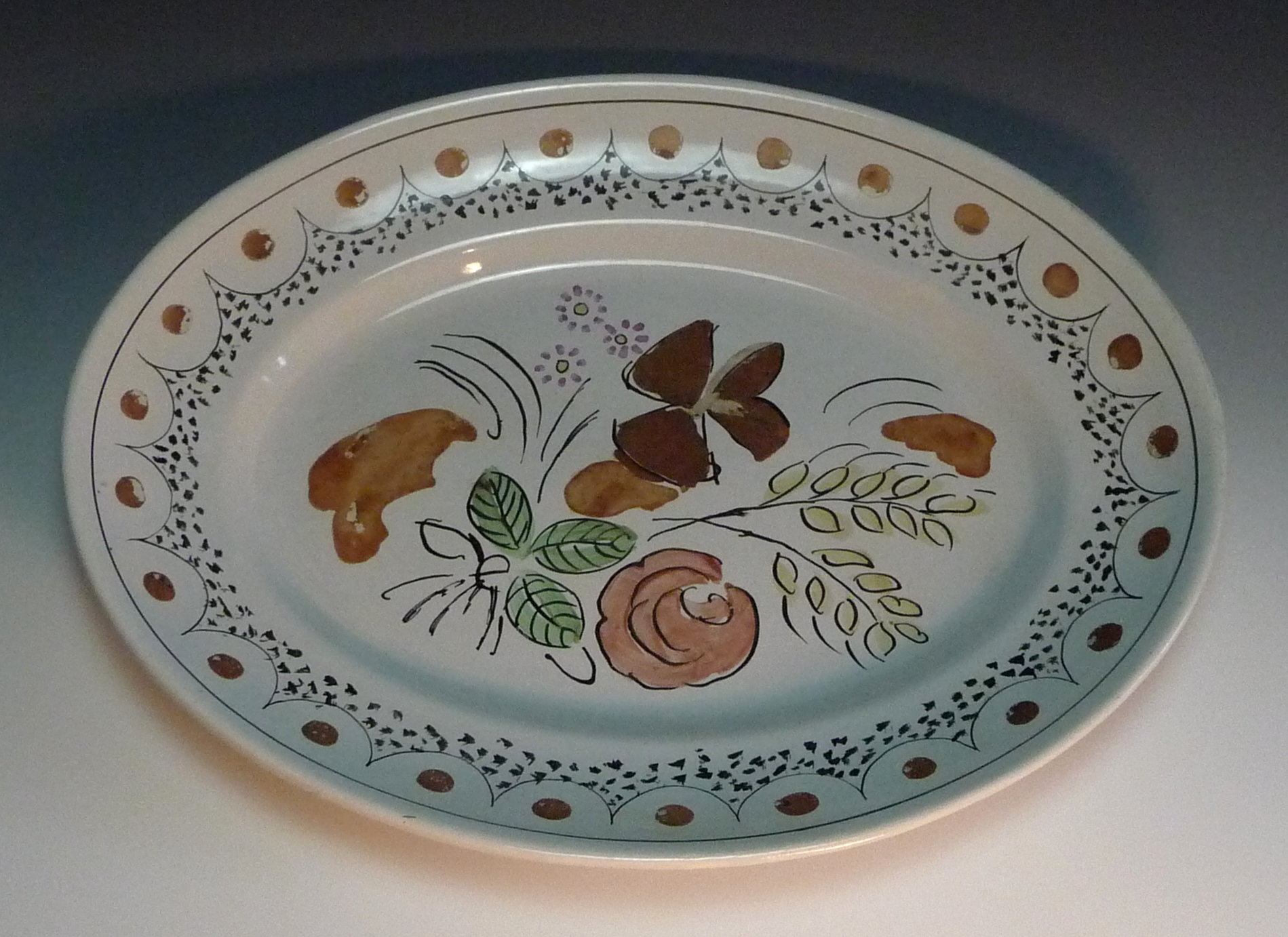
Clarice Cliff plate designed by Duncan Grant dated 1934

Between 1932 and 1934 Cliff was the art director for a major project involving nearly 30 artists of the day (prompted by the Prince of Wales) to promote good design on tableware. The 'Artists in Industry' earthenware examples were produced under her direction, and the artists included such notable names as Duncan Grant, Paul Nash, Barbara Hepworth, Vanessa Bell, and Dame Laura Knight. The project 'Modern Art for the Table' was launched at Harrods London in October 1934 but received a mixed response from both the public and the press, though at the same time Cliff's own patterns and shapes were selling in large quantities around the world.

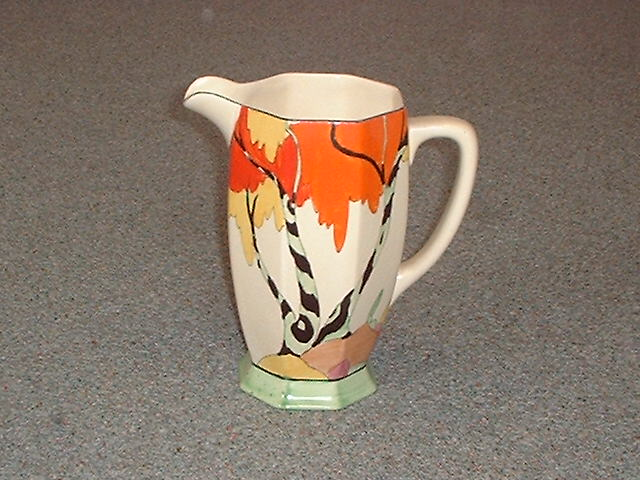
Clarice Cliff 'Honolulu' pattern on traditional 'Athens' shape jug. Approx 1932

Cliff's patterns are highly stylised and interpreted in strong colors, such as the 1933 Honolulu pattern. The trees are enameled in red (coral) orange and yellow. Cliff produced a colourway variation on this by simply changing the trees to shades of blue and pink, and this was then called Rudyard after a local Staffordshire beauty spot.

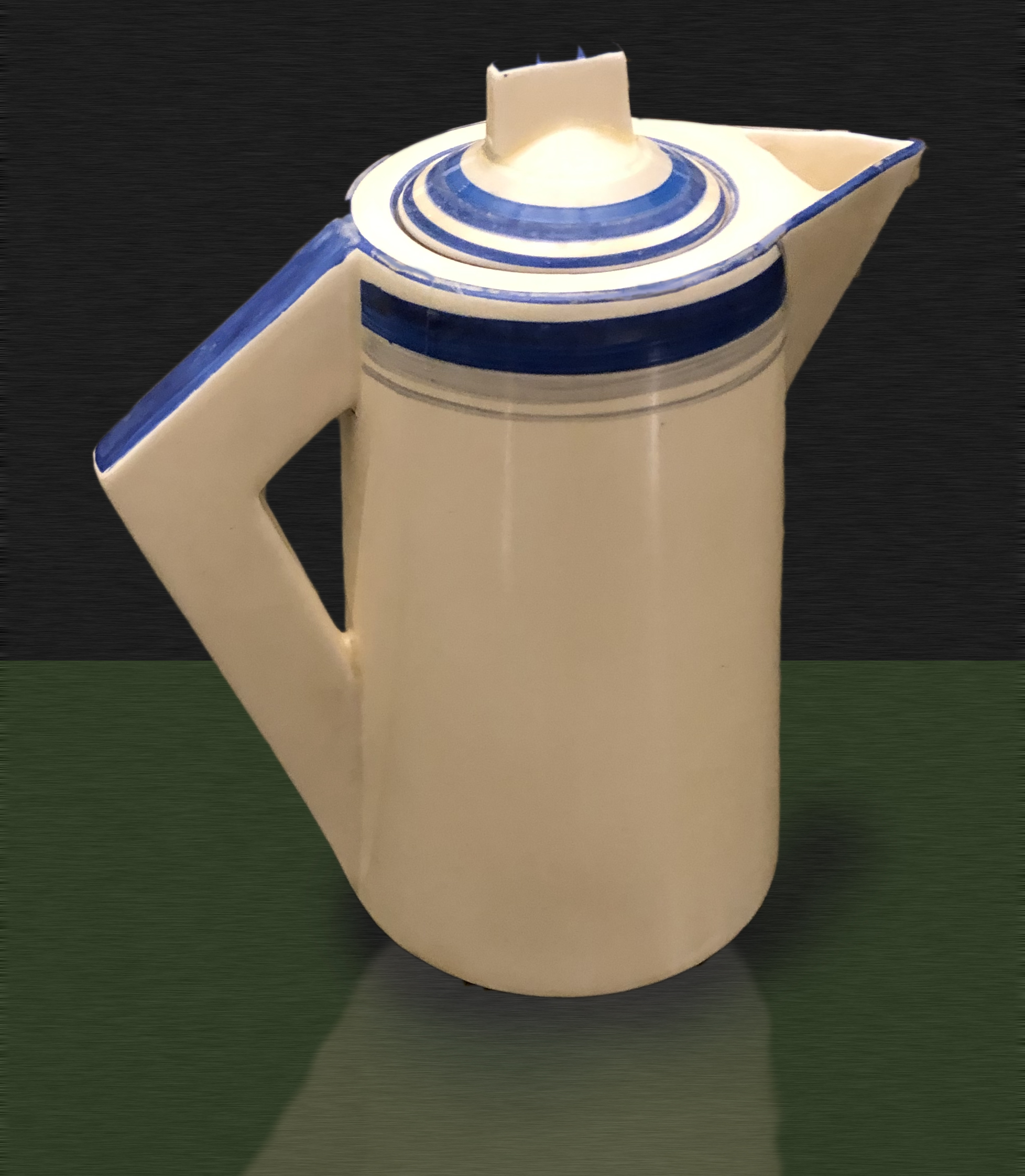
Coffee pot designed by Clarice Cliff, part of the 'Conical' series, with the rare 'Blue and White' pattern, circa 1929

Clarice Cliff's fame and success in the 1930s are hard to fully appreciate now, but at that time there was no such thing as 'career women'. The publicity she received in the national press was unprecedented. Research by a PhD student into the contemporary press between 1928 and 1936 found "360 articles about Cliff and her work were published in the trade press, women's magazines, national and local newspapers." This was put into context when he pointed out that in the same period, Susie Cooper, another Staffordshire ceramicist and designer, had "fewer than 20 reviews, all bar one in the trade press".

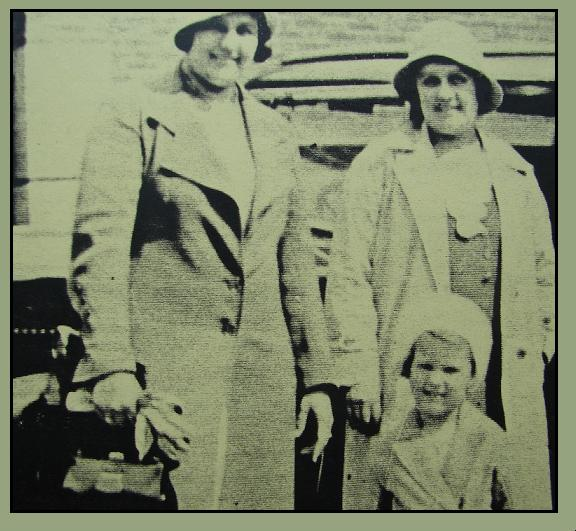
Clarice Cliff (right) with visitors to Newport Pottery in 1933

Despite all the publicity she received, Cliff was camera shy, and in most cases the images of her pottery were what dominated the women's magazine of the day. One picture which shows Cliff informally was taken when a South African stockist of her ware, from Werner Brothers, visited the factory on a buying trip. Cliff is seen with the 3-year-old daughter and wife of the stockist. After the visit Cliff sent the daughter a present of a child's miniature tea set painted in her Honolulu pattern.

In the mid 30s tastes changed and heavily modeled ware came into vogue. The My Garden series issued from 1934 onwards led the way, with small flowers modelled as a handle or base on more rounded shapes. These were fully painted in bright colours – the body of the ware was covered in thin colour washes – 'Verdant' was green, 'Sunrise' yellow and so on. The range included vases, bowls, jugs, a biscuit barrel, and proved very popular as gift ware. It was produced in more muted colours, right until the start of the war in 1939.

Other shapes included the 1937 'Raffia' based on traditional basketware by Native Americans, decorated in a similar style to them with small blocks of colour. More popular was the heavily modeled Harvest ware, jugs and bowls modelled with corn and fruit. After the war this range was heavily marketed in North America (very patriotically) as England. This later ware attracts relatively low prices at auction.

== The 1940s ==
In 1940, after the death of Ann Shorter, Colley's wife, he married Cliff and she moved into his home at Chetwynd House on Northwood Lane in Clayton, Staffordshire. This Arts and Crafts home had been designed in 1899 and was one of the earliest commissions of the British architects Parker and Unwin (Richard Barry Parker and Raymond Unwin) who were later heavily involved in the Welwyn Garden City project.

During World War II only plain white pottery (utility ware) was permitted under wartime regulations, so Cliff assisted with management of the pottery but was not able to continue design work. Instead she concentrated her creative talents on gardening and the massive 4-acre (1.6 ha) garden at Chetwynd House became her shared passion with Shorter.

After the war, although Cliff was occasionally nostalgic for the 'Bizarre' years, as witnessed in personal letters to friends, she seemed to be realistic and accepted the commercial taste was for conservative ware. Clarice seemed to enjoy playing a lesser role at the factory, knowing that she could not recapture those crazy days of the thirties. Much of the postwar production went to Australia, New Zealand or North America, where the taste was for formal ware in traditional English designs such as Tonquin rather than the striking patterns and shapes that had established Cliff's reputation; thus she was never to return to creative work. The postwar ware has little value at auction.

== Later life ==
A. J. Wilkinson and their Newport Pottery continued to sell ware under Cliff's name until 1964. The death of Colley Shorter in 1963 led Cliff to sell the factory to Midwinter in 1964 and she retired, becoming somewhat of a recluse. However, from December 1971 to January 1972, the first exhibition of Clarice Cliff pottery took place at Brighton, East Sussex. Cliff reluctantly provided comments for the catalogue, though she declined to attend the opening.

The exhibition was prompted by enthusiastic collectors, including Martin Battersby, an early devotee of 20s and 30s design, the first author on that period to publish major works, and a devotee of Cliff's ceramics. Then, on 23 October 1972, Cliff died suddenly at Chetwynd House.

== Revival of interest in her work ==
The exhibition and the first book published privately in 1976 'Clarice Cliff' by Peter Wentworth-Sheilds and Kay Johnson (L'Odeon publishing) marked the start of a major revival of interest in Cliff's work, which has continued to be sought after by Art Deco ceramic collectors ever since.

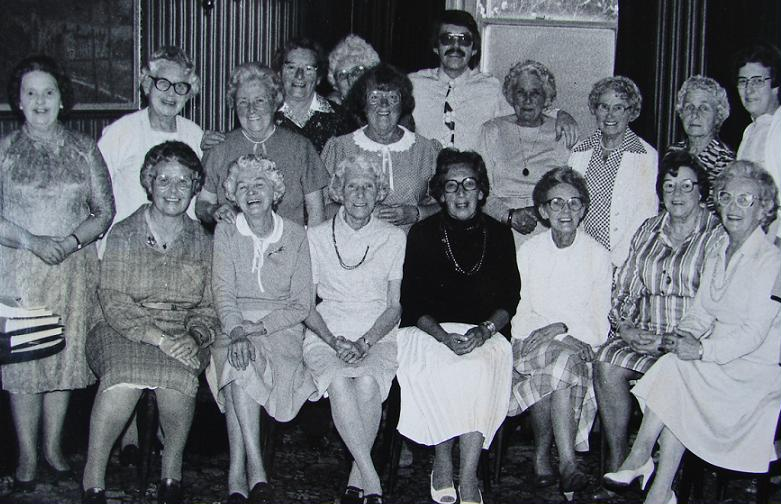
Cliff's original painters re-united by the CCCC founder Leonard Griffin who is pictured with them in 1986

In 1982 the original Clarice Cliff Collectors Club was formed and promoted her and her work throughout the world. The club founder had appealed in the Staffordshire Evening Sentinel for anyone who worked with Cliff to contact him and was delighted when he found 28 former workers. Still calling themselves the 'Bizarre girls' even in their mid-1970s and early 1980s Cliff's former painters were delighted in the interest in the pottery they had hand painted 50 years earlier. They attended the annual meetings of the club, and were to be involved in many television and radio programs about Cliff, and a mass of books that appeared. Many of their memories were recorded in the CCCC Reviews from 1982 to 2004. The club also held meetings and exhibitions in Britain, North America, Australia and New Zealand.

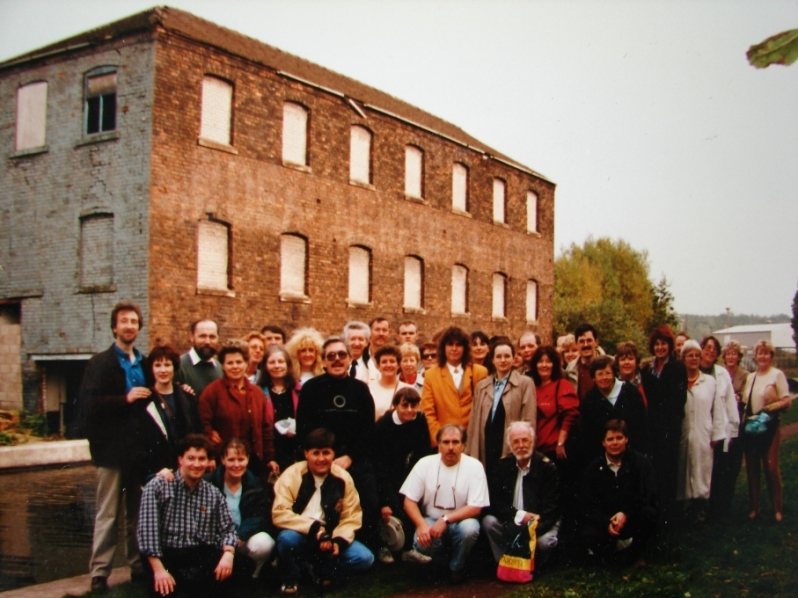
Members of the original CCCC at Cliff's 'Bizarre shop' at Newport, Burslem, in 1992

The Stoke-on-Trent meetings visited the old painting shop of Bizarre ware by the canal at Newport, Burslem, from 1987 to 1997. It was demolished by Wedgwood in 1997, and the land sold for housing.

In 1985, a series of pieces were produced under the title The Bizarre Collection, with the mark for the "Royal Staffordshire Pottery by Clarice Cliff", and marketed by the Midwinter pottery.

The three principal designs produced were Honolulu on a 12-inch Mei Ping vase, Summerhouse on a 13-inch wall plate and a striking version of Umbrellas and Rain on a conical bowl. These pieces can be identified with a tiny impressed "85" for the year of manufacture. There was also a selection of six conical sugar sifters, again hand-painted, with the exception of the aforementioned Crocus which was lithographed.

A chain of mergers finally led to Wedgwood owning the Clarice Cliff name, and from 1992 to 2002 they too produced a range of reproductions of the highly sought 1930s pieces.

The first pieces produced included a ginger jar in House and Bridge, a large shape 14 vase in Solitude, a Stamford shape teapot milk and sugar in Pink Roof Cottage, a Conical bowl in Tennis, and a wall plaque in Lightning; there was also a Latona large shape 14 vase that was exclusively available to members of the CCCC.

These reproductions should not be confused with forgeries (of which a number are found), the Wedgwood ones are clearly marked as 'Wedgwood Clarice Cliff'. An original Cliff painter Alice Andrews, then in her 80s, was employed to appear at launches of the ware in stores throughout Britain. A 2021 movie “The Colour Room’ was recently released about Clarice Cliff.

== Status as an artist ==
In the mid-1990s Cliff's position as a major artist of her era was confirmed when she was included in major international reference works: the Dictionary of Art by Macmillan Publishers, and Allgemeines Künstlerlexikon by K. G. Saur Verlag.

The work of the CCCC culminated with the centenary exhibition Clarice Cliff, the Art of Bizarre at the Wedgwood Museum, Barlaston, Stoke-on-Trent. Nowadays, with 26 years of experience the club is based online (see below). It should not be confused with an organisation who used the same name from 2001 after registering it in 1997.

The CCCC was then the consultant for the BBC Radio 4 drama The Bizarre Girl, written by Lizzie Slater which was described as "an uplifting drama exploring the dramatic rise of Clarice Cliff from the shop floor to Company Art Director – illustrating how a working-class Staffordshire girl brought modern art to the people." The drama was broadcast in December 2000.

A film of her life, titled The Colour Room and directed by Claire McCarthy, was released on 12 November 2021. Cliff is played by Phoebe Dynevor.

In April 2024, a blue plaque was placed at the flat where Cliff lived in 20 Snow Hill, Shelton, Stoke-on-Trent, Staffordshire. The blue plaque scheme is run by Historic England to mark the lives of inspirational people.

== Collecting ==
In 2002, Peter Wentworth-Sheilds and Kay Johnson, the authors of the original 'Clarice Cliff' book from 1976, returned to Britain to lecture at a CCCC event at Christie's, South Kensington. They spoke about the early days of collecting when their first purchase had been "a Summerhouse Athens jug for 7 shillings and 6 pence, 35 pence".

Rare combinations of shape and pattern attract high prices at auction. The world record price for a piece of Clarice Cliff is held by Christie's, South Kensington, London, who sold an 18-inch (460 mm) 'charger' (wall plaque) in the May Avenue pattern for £39,500 in 2004. Shortly after this the same auction house sold an 8-inch (200 mm) vase in Sunspots for £20,000.

A rare Red Autumn shape 369 vase sold for £4,900 at Fielding's auctioneers, Stourbridge in the West Midlands, and Woolley and Wallis auctioneers Salisbury sold a 3-inch (76 mm) high miniature vase in Café (used as a salesman's sample in the 1930s) for a staggering £3000. In May 2009 an eighteen-inch charger in the May Avenue pattern sold for £20,500 at Fielding's auctioneers.

In 2009, Will Farmer of the BBC Antiques Roadshow and members of the Clarice Cliff Collectors Club unveiled three plaques. These were on her birthplace, Meir Street, Tunstall, her second home on Edwards Street, Tunstall and the site of Newport Pottery by the canal in Burslem where her Bizarre ware was decorated. These were featured in special Antiques Roadshow programme that December.

In September 2009, the Victoria and Albert Museum in London opened its 'New Ceramics Galleries' and Cliff's work was chosen to be included: "There will be two rooms displaying 20th-century collections. One will show ceramics made in a factory context and will include objects by designers such as Susie Cooper and Clarice Cliff".

== See also ==
- Charlotte Rhead
- Truda Carter
- Keith Murray (ceramic artist)
