= Clayburn Pottery =

English pottery company

- Type: Private company
- Industry: Pottery
- Founded: 1953
- Founder: William Lunt
- Defunct: 1960
- Fate: Ceased trading
- Headquarters: Milner St, Hanley, Stoke-on-Trent, England
- Number of locations: 1 factory (1953)
- Key people: Roy Midwinter
- Products: Hand painted decorative wares

The Clayburn Pottery was an English pottery works based in Milner St, Hanley, Stoke-on-Trent.

== History ==
The company was established in 1953 and ceased trading by 1960. The Clayburn pottery produced hand painted decorative wares such as lamp bases, small bowls, jugs and cruet sets. These were complementary to the products of the Midwinter Pottery, and Clayburn was established by William Lunt, who was a director of Midwinter. This link was strengthened by the arrival of Roy Midwinter as another director of the company.

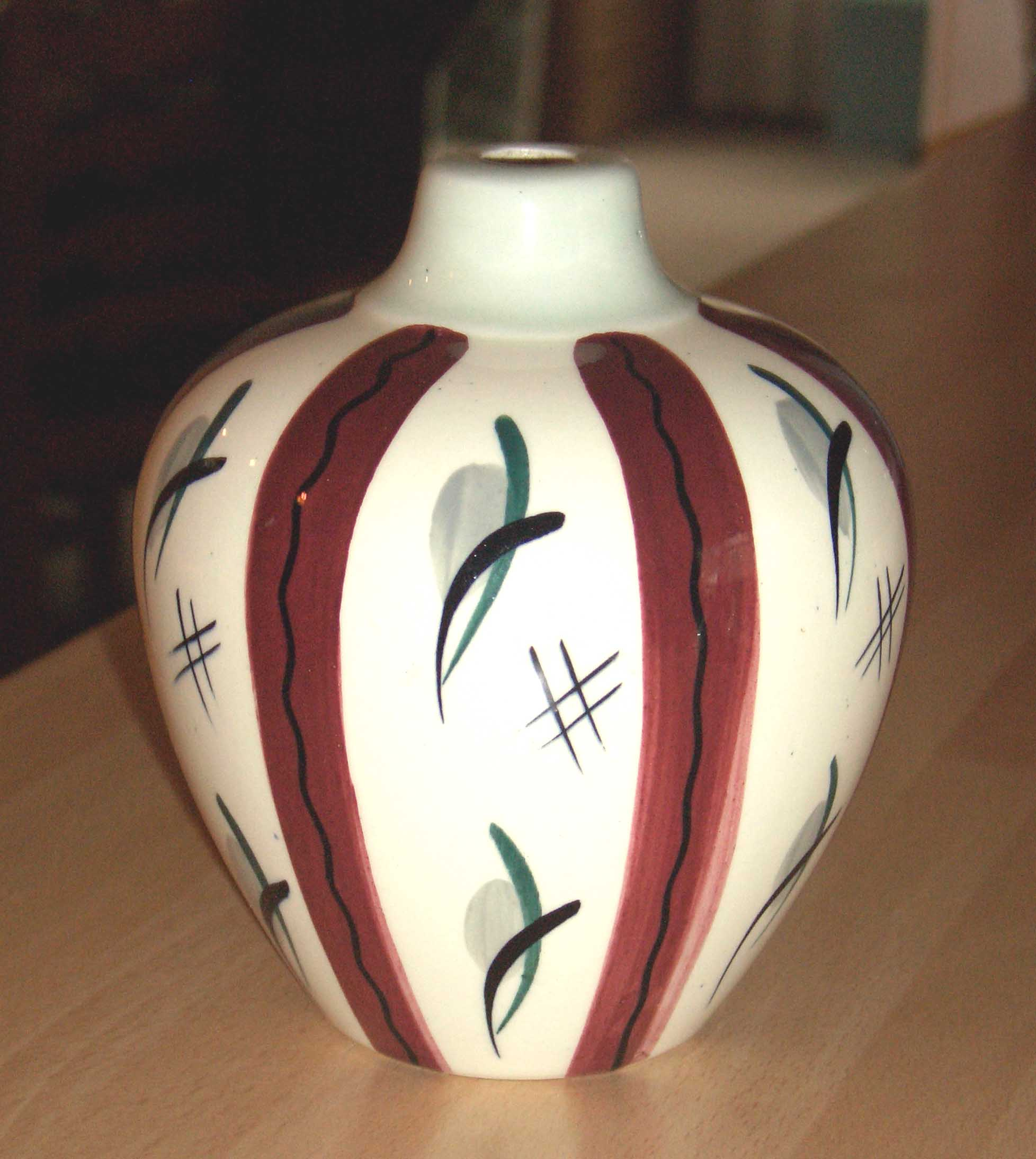
A lampbase painted with a version of Jessie Tait's 'Fiesta' design

Many of the designs Clayburn produced were similar to those of the Midwinter Pottery, and were intended to sell alongside them. Examples include lamp bases that matched a Midwinter dinner service. In particular, the Midwinter Pottery designer Jessie Tait produced versions of her Fiesta, Prima Vera and Tropicana designs for Clayburn.

An anthropomorphic cruet set, painted with a version of Jessie Tait's 'Prima Vera' design
