= Alfred Meakin Ltd =

Defunct British pottery company

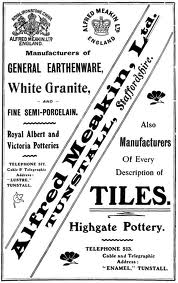
advertisement showing factory marks

Alfred Meakin Ltd Pottery was a British company that produced earthenware and semi-porcelain tableware, tea sets, and toilet ware from 1875 to 1976. The company was founded by Alfred Meakin, the brother of James and George Meakin who ran a large pottery company in Hanley, Stoke-on-Trent. Alfred Meakin operated from the Royal Albert, Victoria, and Highgate Potteries in Tunstall and later acquired the Newfield Pottery and the Furlong Mill. The company was known for its ironstone china and white granite ware, which were exported to many countries, especially the USA. The company also made decorative wares with various patterns and shapes, such as Bamboo, Fishhook, Chelsea, and Bleu de Roi. The company was bought by Robert Johnson, Alfred's uncle, for his son Stuart Johnson in 1908, and remained in the Johnson family until 1976, when it became part of Myott-Meakin and later Churchill Group A tile from 1901 is held by the British Museum and a dinner service is held by Canterbury Museum and work is in the National Trust Art collection. Work is held by the Science Museum Group and the V&A.
