= J. & G. Meakin =

Defunct English pottery manufacturing company

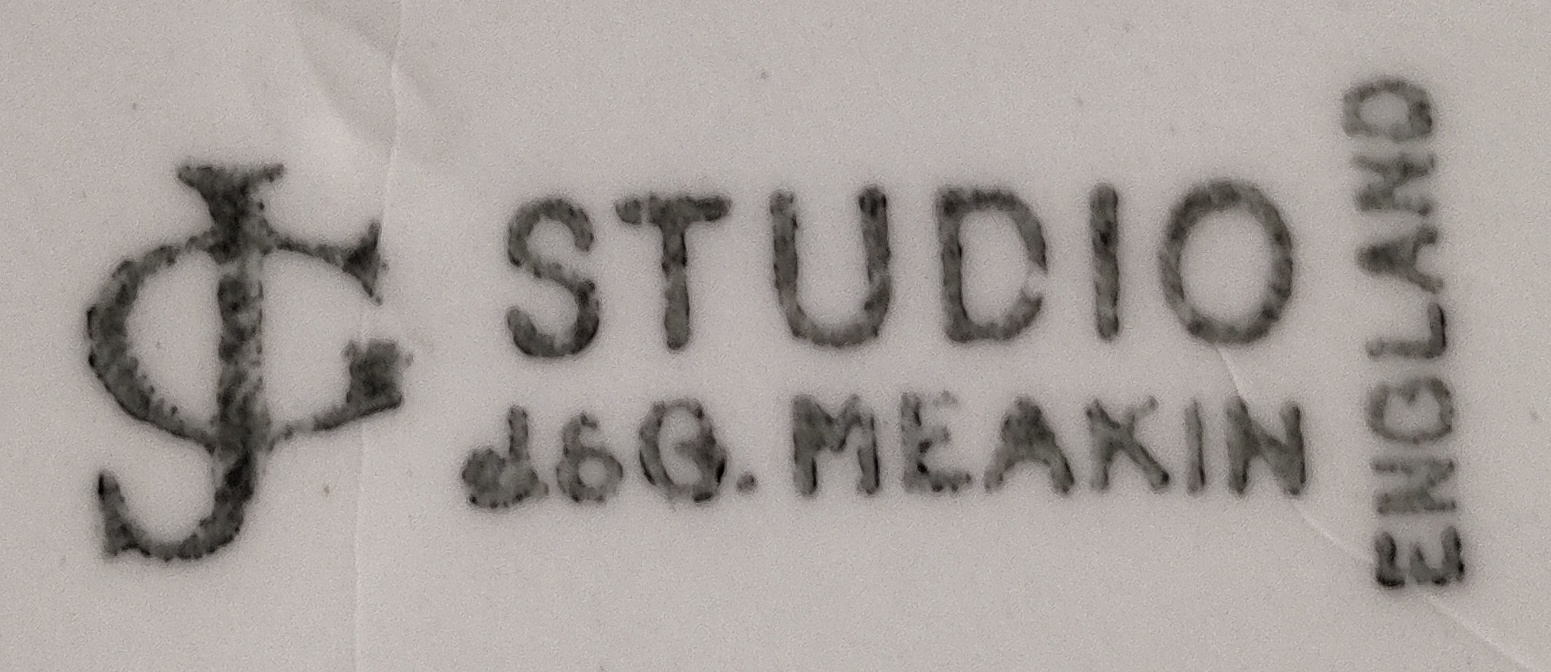
- Maker's mark, from a mid-20th century coffee service
- Type: Private (subsidiary of Wedgwood Group)
- Industry: Staffordshire pottery
- Founded: 1851
- Defunct: 2000
- Fate: Acquired, later ceased production, factory demolished 2005
- Headquarters: Hanley, Stoke-on-Trent, England
- Parent: Wedgwood Group

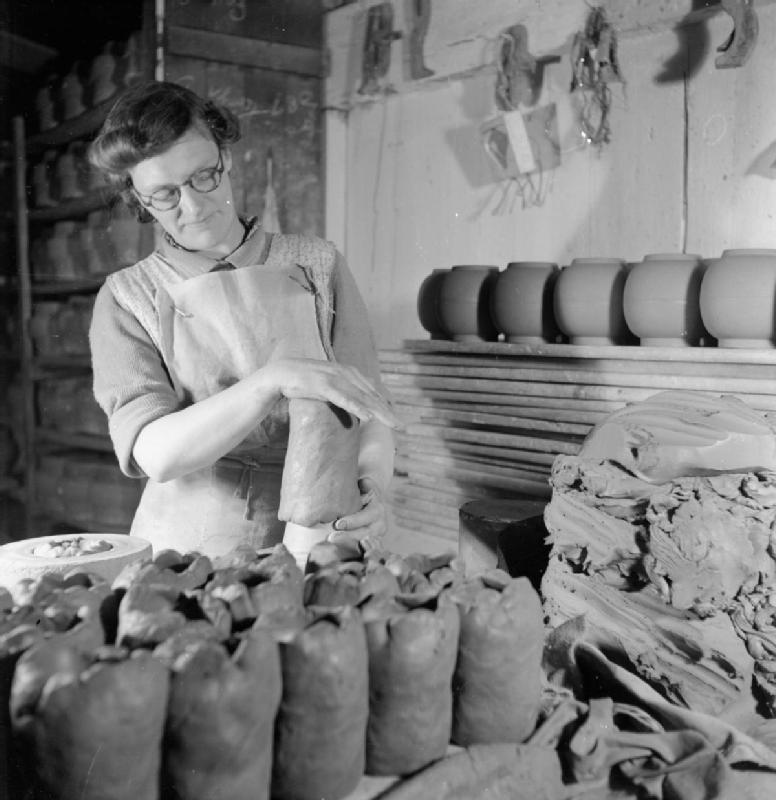
J and G Meakin Pottery, Hanley, Stoke-on-trent, 1942

J. & G. Meakin was an English pottery manufacturing company founded in 1851 and based in Hanley, Stoke-on-Trent, Staffordshire.

== History ==
In the 19th century, J. & G. Meakin was known for the vast quantities of cheap ironstone china it produced for the domestic English market and for export to Australia, Canada, New Zealand and the United States.

From around 1970, designs included Liberty, Sterling, Trend, Classic and Heirloom. Some of these were influenced from earlier designs. The newer wares can be distinguished by backstamp markings such as 'permanent colours', 'everlasting colour', or 'dishwasher proof'.

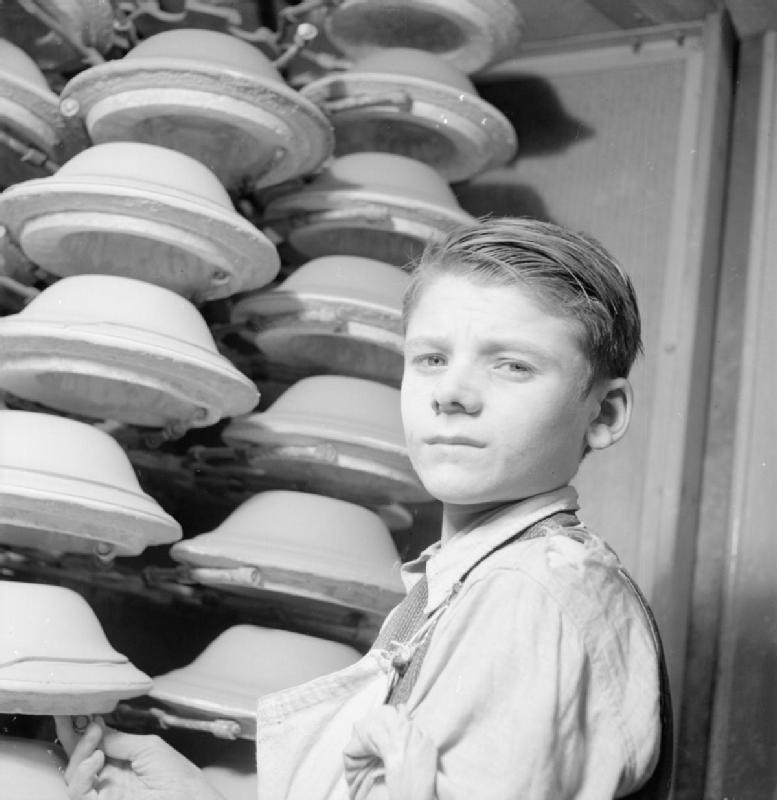
"Potter's attendant Ken Russell stacks plates into the drying oven", 1942

J & G Meakin had close family and corporate affiliations to the potteries Johnson Brothers, and Alfred Meakin Ltd, which explains why many patterns are similar, if not almost exactly the same.

There was a takeover by J. & G. Meakin in 1968 of Midwinter Pottery.

Eastwood works in Litchfield Street, Hanley, remains to this day and is now the Emma Bridgwater factory, decorating studio and outlet shop.

The firm was taken over by the Wedgwood Group in 1970. In 2000 production under the Meakin name ceased and their long-established works, Eagle Pottery, was then used for the production of Johnson Bros pottery. Eagle Pottery closed in 2004 when production was transferred abroad; the works were demolished in 2005.

== See also ==
- Dorlestone Hall
