= Midwinter Pottery =

English ceramics manufacturer

- Industry: Pottery
- Predecessor: W. R. Midwinter (1910-1932), W. R. Midwinter Ltd (1932-1987)
- Founded: 1910
- Founder: William Robinson Midwinter
- Defunct: 1987
- Fate: Acquired by Wedgwood
- Successor: Meakin & Midwinter Holdings Ltd 1968-1970, J. & G. Meakin Ltd.
- Headquarters: Burslem, Stoke-on-Trent, England
- Key people: Roy Midwinter (Director)
- Products: Ceramics
- Number of employees: 700+ (1930s)

The Midwinter Pottery was founded as W. R. Midwinter by William Robinson Midwinter in Burslem, Stoke-on-Trent in 1910 and had become one of England's largest potteries by the late 1930s with more than 700 employees. Production of Midwinter pottery ceased in 1987.

Close up of a jug and side plates in the popular Zambesi design, 1950s

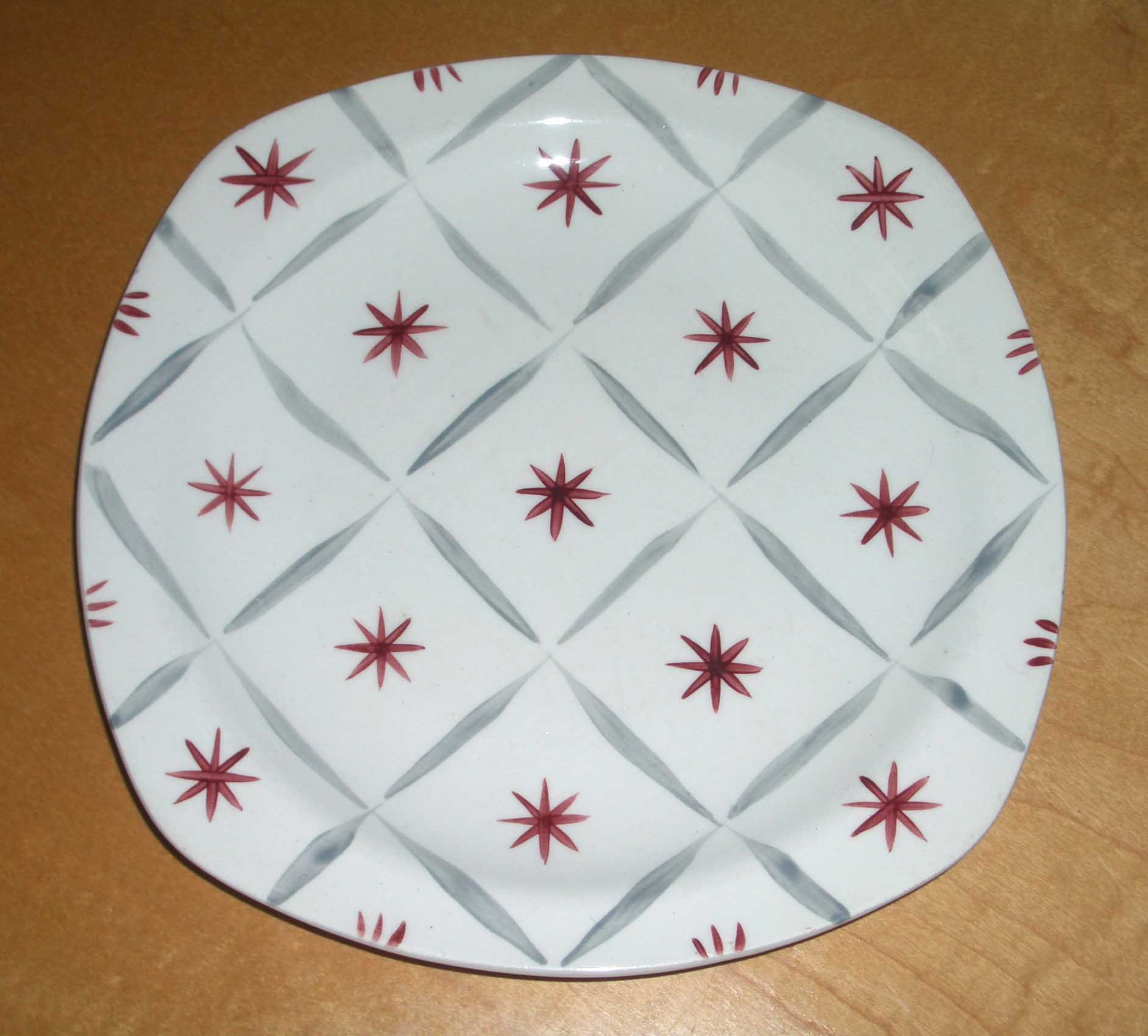
Galaxy, a hand painted design by Jessie Tait, 1950s

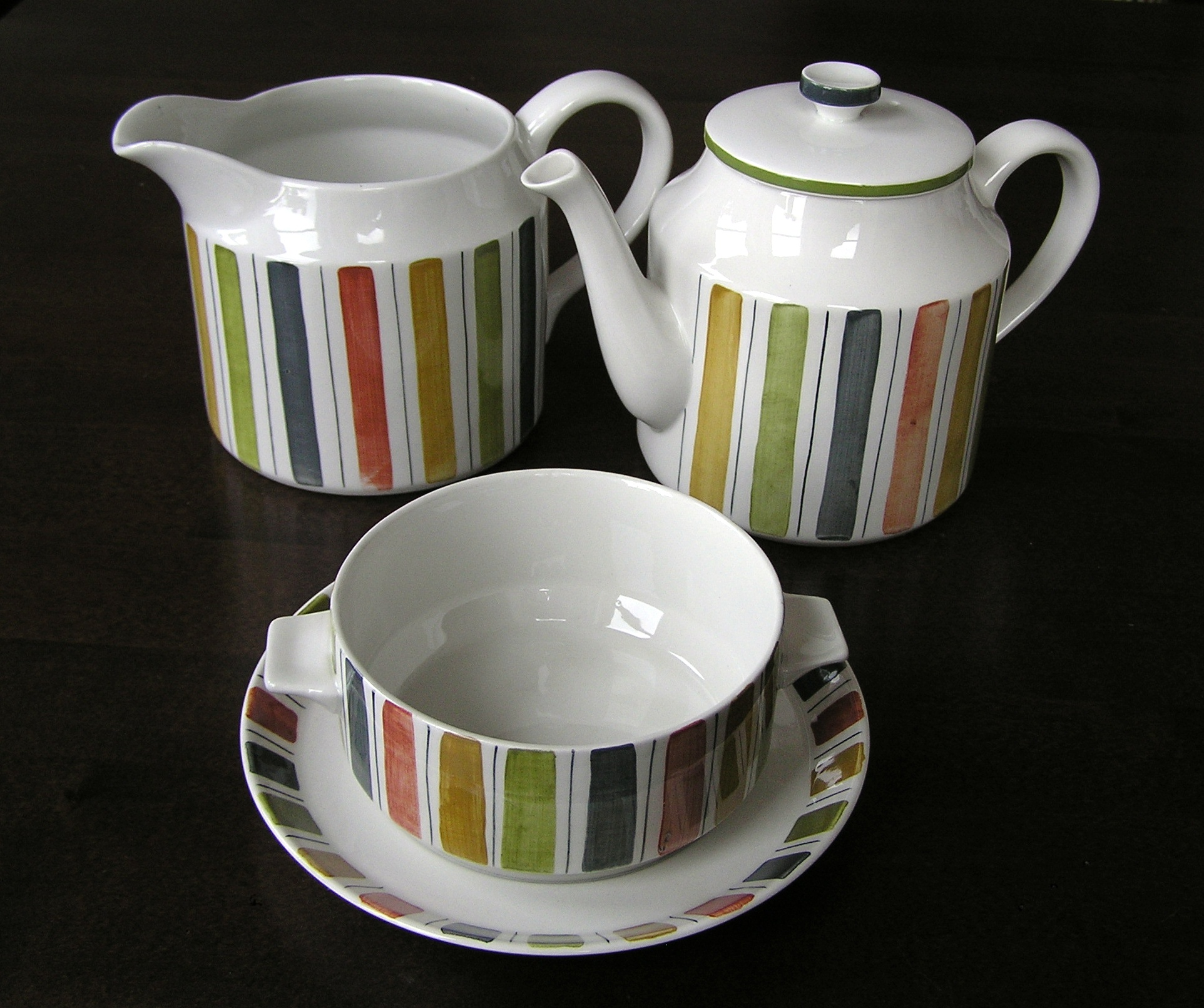
Midwinter ware from the Mexicana range

English Garden, transfer printed on the 'Fine' shape, late 1960s

== History ==
In the 1950s, under the leadership of the director Roy Midwinter, the company became one of the leading innovators in British tableware production. A large part of this was due to the noted ceramicists and designers who worked for the pottery, including Jessie Tait, Terence Conran, Hugh Casson, David Douglas, John Russell and Peter Scott. The Midwinter Pottery was also an innovator in producing 'accessories' to their basic dinner services and tea sets. The Clayburn Pottery, a sister company to Midwinter, made pieces such as lamp bases that could be added to a Midwinter dinner service. In the 1960s, the Spanish Garden design, which was very successful on dinner ware and tea sets, adorned articles such as a bread bin and chopping board.

The costs involved in developing two unsuccessful new ranges weakened the company, and there was a takeover by J. & G. Meakin in 1968. In 1970 Meakin was itself bought out by Wedgwood. Pottery was produced under the Midwinter name from their factory until 1987.

Many of the pieces produced by Midwinter in the 1950s and 1960s have become highly collectible, being typical of the styles of those eras.
