= Susie Cooper =

English ceramic designer (1902–1995)

Susan Vera Cooper OBE (29 October 1902 – 28 July 1995) was a prolific English ceramic designer working in the Stoke-on-Trent pottery industries from the 1920s to the 1980s.

== Life and work ==
Born in Burslem, Staffordshire, she was the youngest of seven children. From an early age she developed an interest in drawing, and began her art education by attending night classes at the Burslem School of Art. In 1922 she joined the ceramics firm A. E. Gray & Co. Ltd, partially as a means to gain entry to the Royal College of Art. However it was an ambition she abandoned as she decided to focus on the potteries in Stoke.

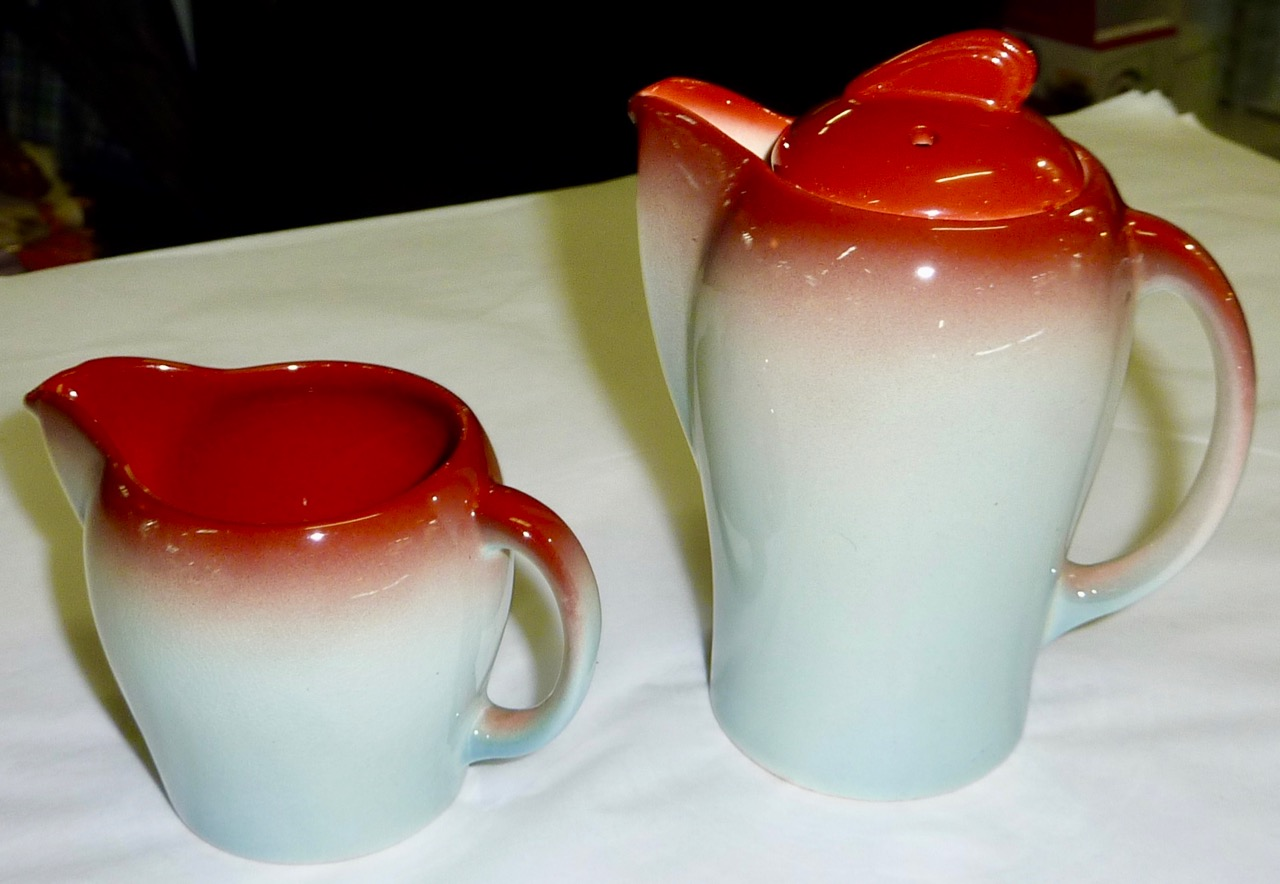
Susie Cooper hot water jug and creamer in Kestrel design

A. Edward Gray quickly discovered her talents as a painter and designer, and soon she was producing her hand-painted floral designs. In 1923 A. E. Gray launched the Gloria Lustre Range employing the technique of lustreware which she helped to decorate. In 1929, motivated by her desire to design ceramic shapes in addition to decors, she broke away with her brother-in-law Albert "Jack" Beeson to set up her own business, as Susie Cooper Potteries.

She was so successful at decorating wares created by Harry Wood that in the 1930s she set up her business in his factory in Burslem. Her business was there for the next fifty years and surprisingly for the time led by a woman.

She worked for many other pottery firms over the next several decades, including Wedgwood. In 1940 she was awarded Royal Designer for Industry by the Royal Society of Arts, and in 1979 she received an OBE. The Princess Royal and Elizabeth, The Queen Mother were purchasers of her work.

At the age of 80 she retired to live on the Isle of Man, and died there in 1995. Like the Potteries-based ceramic designers Clarice Cliff and Charlotte Rhead, her work has become valued by some pottery collectors.
