= John Shelton (artist) =

English painter

John Shelton (April 1923 – April 1993) was an English painter and ceramic artist born in Shelton, Stoke-on-Trent.

Shelton attended the Burslem School of Art from 1937 to 1942 where he studied under Reginald Haggar. A contemporary and friend of Arthur Berry, he was awarded a scholarship for the Slade School of Fine Art, London which he joined in 1945. He left the Slade in March 1946 due to the financial hardships of artistic life in London before returning to complete his scholarship from 1948-50. It was this in-between period in which Shelton changed his name from Hancock.

Shelton was in Fitzrovia in the mid 1940s and was in the circle of John Minton, Robert Colquhoun and Robert MacBryde, Colquhoun in particular providing artistic influence. Shelton's best-known work is the series of Cat and Table paintings, and the Potteries Museum acquired one such example in 1988.

British artist and critic Reginald Haggar noted that Shelton "was one of a richly endowed bunch of students who have gone on to enrich the tradition of oil [and watercolour] painting in this country and the field of art teaching".

Shelton produced a large series of monotypes. Shelton was also a prolific pottery-maker, and he incorporated themes from Greek mythology in several of his ceramic pieces. Theseus, the Minotaur and the centaur were typical subjects.

Shelton's work resides in the Potteries Museum & Art Gallery and in many private collections, including those of the actor Freddie Jones and the late Pat Phoenix. Shelton's work was most recently exhibited in October 2012 alongside that of fellow students Arthur Berry and Norman Cope.
