= Pat Douthwaite =

Scottish artist (1934–2002)

- Born: 28 July 1934; Glasgow, Scotland
- Died: 26 July 2002 (aged 67); Dundee, Scotland
- Education: Self-taught
- Known for: Painting, Contemporary Art
- Movement: Modernism
- Spouse: Paul Hogarth

Pat Douthwaite (28 July 1934 – 26 July 2002) was a Scottish artist. She has been notably compared to Amedeo Modigliani and Chaïm Soutine, the peintres maudits of early twentieth-century Paris.

== Life ==
Douthwaite was born in Glasgow, Scotland, to mother Winifred Rachael, and father Thomas Leslie Douthwaite. She spent her early life in Paisley. She travelled widely, living in various places across the world until her death in Dundee, in 2002. Although she was born in 1934, she claimed throughout her life to have been born in 1939.

In 1947, Douthwaite took up expressive dance and ballet classes, only making the decision to be a painter later in her life, and without any formal art education. Her work is featured in several different museums. She was married to Paul Hogarth between 1963-1970, and they had one son together.

Douthwaite's extensive travel during her life saw her living in York, Edinburgh, Dumfriesshire, and Berwick upon Tweed. In addition, she travelled to North Africa, India and Peru.

== Dance career ==
Douthwaite took up dance classes in 1947, which were taught by Margaret Morris. It was there that she met the artist J.D. Fergusson, Morris' partner. Fergusson was a landscape artist and taught Douthwaite how to appreciate the light interacting with a landscape. She continued to dance and was a part of Morris's Celtic Ballet in 1954 at Jacob's Pillow Theatre in Massachusetts U.S.A.

== Art career ==
In the late 1950s, Douthwaite made the decision to take up a career in visual art, rather than dance, with Fergusson persuading her not to engage in formal art education. She had her first solo show at 57 Gallery in Edinburgh in 1958. She left Scotland in 1958, and associated herself with a wide artistic crowd which included Robert MacBryde, Robert Colquhoun, Peter Cook, Roger Law, and William Crozier, the latter of whom she had met in Glasgow. She moved into Crozier's house in Essex in 1958, however the extent of her relationship with many other of these artists is not clear.

In December 1963 Douthwaite exhibited alongside the artists Philip Jones and Bill Featherstone at the Grabowski Gallery in London. A review of the exhibition by Kenneth Coutts-Smith appeared in Arts Review, where he remarked on her enigmatic, dreamlike and disturbing work which he felt had 'an almost embroidered applique effect'.

Douthwaite exhibited with the Women's International Art Club in London between 1960 and 1966.

Although much of her work explores issues surrounding femininity and womanhood, Douthwaite did not self identify as a feminist. She was the recipient of various awards from the Scottish Arts Council. In 2005, following her death, the Scottish National Gallery in Edinburgh held a memorial exhibition.

Douthwaite's work pursued a variety of themes including the Manson Trial, American Women Bandits and the aviator Amy Johnson.

== Exhibitions of work ==
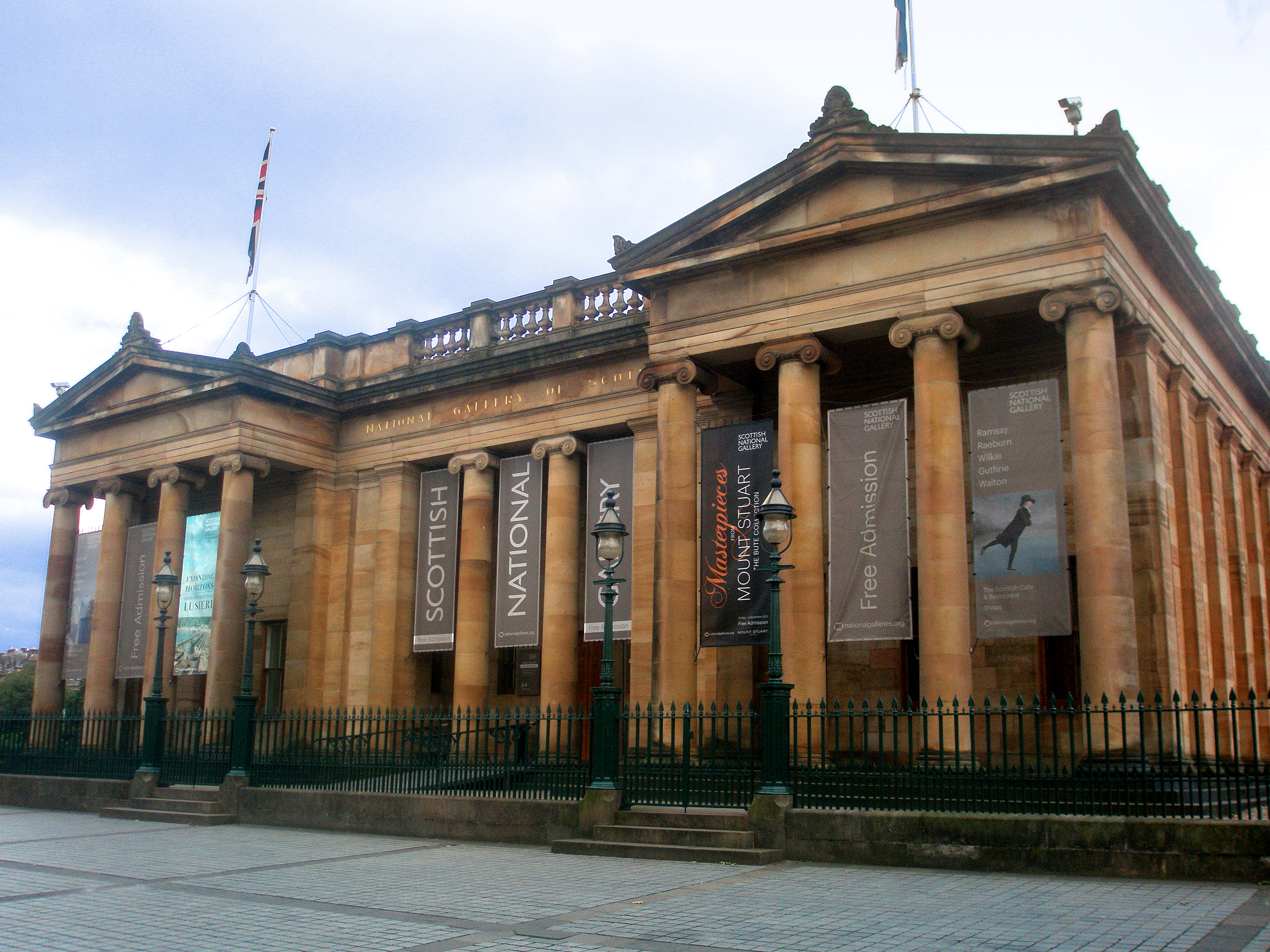
The Scottish National Gallery in Edinburgh, where Douthwaite held a solo exhibition in 1993.

In 1967, Richard Demarco saw Pat Douthwaite as a talented Scottish artist and displayed her Mary Queen of Scots in his Edinburgh gallery. In 1967 he debuted her Love Pictures. In 1972-79 her Paintings and Drawings were shown at the Talbot Rice Art Centre and then in 1982 Worshipped Women was introduced by Robert Graves at the Edinburgh Festival. Other notable supporters included Douglas Hall and Guy Peploe. In London, 1982-83 Douthwaite exhibited in the Royal College of Art and in the Third Eye Centre in Glasgow, Scotland, 1999-89. She had a solo exhibition in 1993 at the Scottish National Gallery in Edinburgh of her more recent and final works. The Scottish Gallery held a memorial show in 2005 with an extensive catalogue.

== Galleries holding Douthwaite's work ==
Aberdeen Art Gallery, Ferens Art Gallery, Hull and the Scottish Arts Council.

- Art in Healthcare
- University of St Andrews
- Lillie Art Gallery
- Ferens Art Gallery
- City Art Centre
- Scottish National Gallery of Modern Art
- Paisley Museum and Art Galleries
- The Fleming Collection
- The Hepworth, Wakefield
- University of Stirling
- The Stirling Smith Art Gallery and Museum

== Personal reputation ==
Douthwaite had a reputation as a "compelling" painter, but also as difficult, and insecure. She is described by Cordelia Oliver as having felt increasingly "alienated" throughout her life, and hard to please.
