= Bedford Gardens, London =

Street in Kensington, London

Coordinates: 51°30′21.83″N 0°11′46.66″W

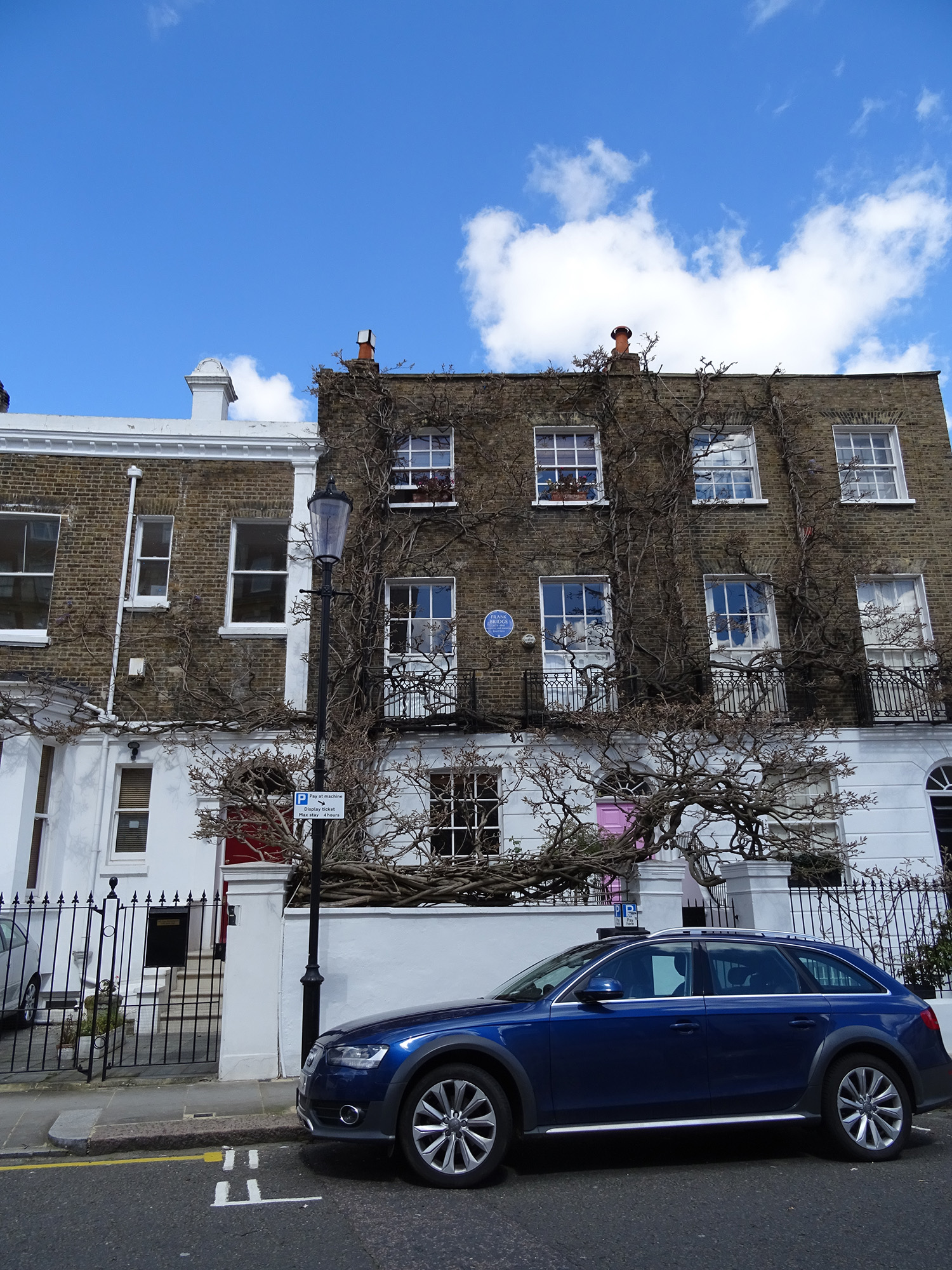
4 Bedford Gardens.

Bedford Gardens is a street in Kensington, London. It runs west–east from Campden Hill Road to Kensington Church Street.

The street was originally called Bedford Place. In 1824, William Hall the elder and William Hall the younger planned to build more or less identical late Georgian terraces on both sides of the street. Only the eastern halves were finished, due to the sudden death of William Hall the younger in 1829 or 1830. The western end was developed largely with semi-detached houses.

Marie Rambert had a ballet school and studio there in 1920, and remained there until 1927, when she moved to the Mercury Theatre, Notting Hill Gate, which became the home of the Ballet Rambert until 1987. In the early 1980s, Roger Tully purchased Rambert's late nineteenth-century dance studio in Bedford Gardens.

Number 77 became a studio and living space for several artists; Robert Colquhoun, Robert MacBryde and John Minton, as well as Jankel Adler.

== Notable residents ==
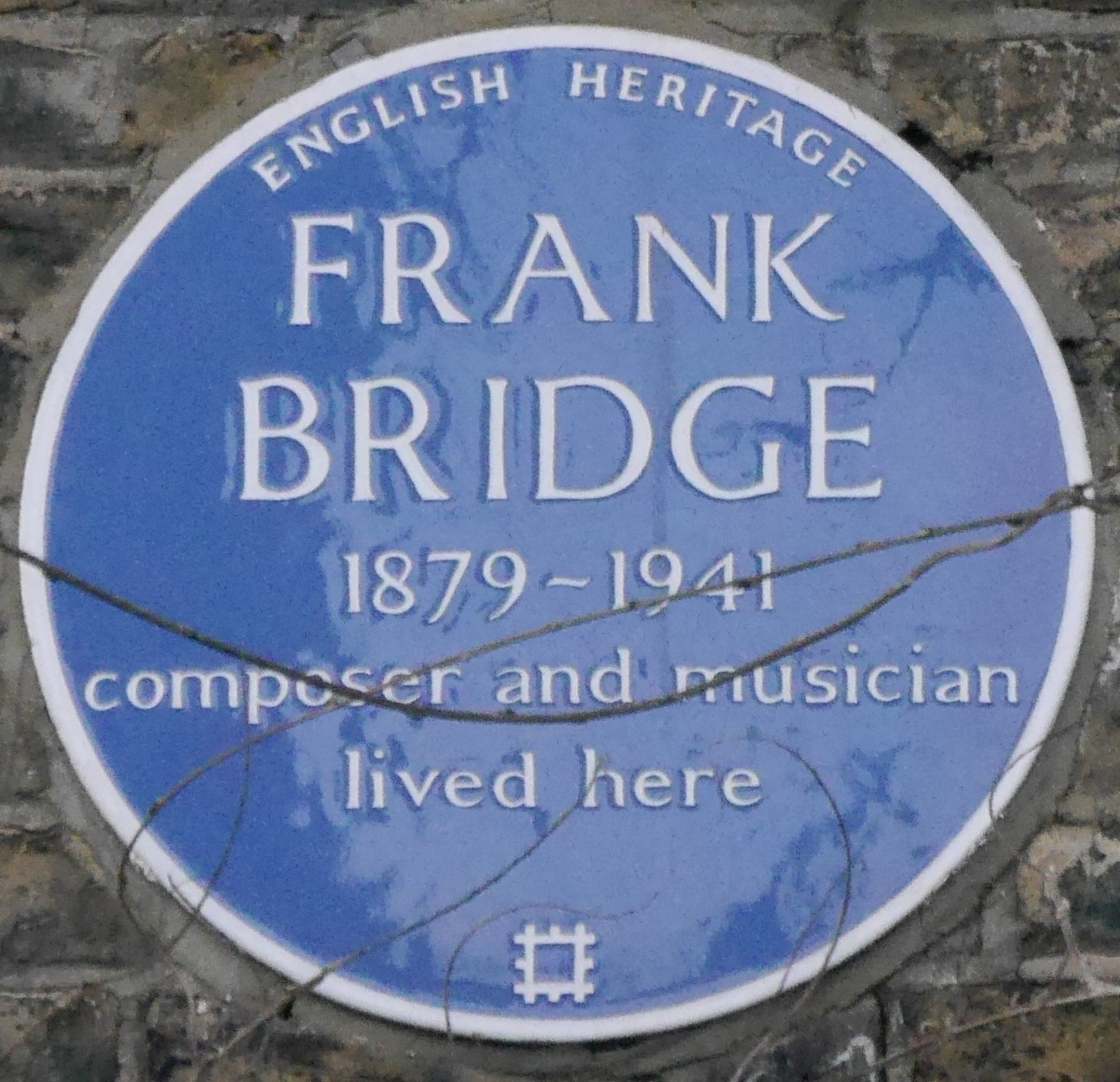
Frank Bridge blue plaque, 4 Bedford Gardens

Notable residents have included:

- #77 Jankel Adler (1895–1949), Polish painter and printmaker
- William Thomas Blanford, geologist and naturalist
- #4 Frank Bridge (1879–1941), composer, violist and conductor
- #43 Archibald Ross Colquhoun, first Administrator of Southern Rhodesia
- #77 Robert Colquhoun (1914–1962), painter, printmaker and theatre set designer
- #12 Edgar Downs (1876–1963), artist
- Henry Justice Ford (1860–1941), artist and illustrator
- #5 Eva Le Gallienne (1899–1991), actress, producer and director
- #5 Richard Le Gallienne (1866–1947), author and poet
- #77 Robert MacBryde (1913–1966), still-life and figure painter and theatre set designer
- #77 John Minton (1917–1957), painter, illustrator, stage designer and teacher
- #77 Arthur Berry (1925–1994), painter, poet, playwright and teacher
- #48 Charles Mozley (1914–1991), artist
- Andrew Dickson Murray (1812–1878), lawyer, botanist, zoologist and entomologist
- #54 Alfred Parsons (1847–1920), illustrator, landscape painter and garden designer
- #52 Henry Edward Watts (1826–1904), journalist
