= William Crozier (Irish artist) =

Irish artist (1930–2011)

William Crozier (5 May 1930 – 12 July 2011) was an Irish-Scots still-life and landscape artist based in Hampshire, England and West Cork in Ireland. He was a member of Aosdána.

== Life and works ==
Crozier was born in Glasgow to Irish parents and educated at the Glasgow School of Art between 1949 and 1953. On graduating he spent time in Paris and Dublin before settling in London, where he gained a reputation as the 1950s equivalent of a Young British Artist through the early success and notoriety of his exhibitions of assemblages and paintings at the ICA, Drian and the Arthur Tooth galleries, with whom he had a long association.

Profoundly affected by post-war existential philosophy, Crozier allied himself and his work consciously with contemporary European art throughout the 1950s and 1960s, rather than with the New York abstractionists, who were more fashionable in the UK at the time. He was also part of the artistic and literary world of 1950s Soho, a close associate of 'the Roberts', Colquhoun and MacBryde, John Minton and William Scott, and part of the expatriate middle-European and Irish intellectual circles in London of the time. Crozier spent 1963 in southern Spain with the Irish poet Anthony Cronin; this proved pivotal to Crozier's development as an artist. On his return to the UK, he began a series of skeletal paintings which anticipated the 'New Expressionist' German painters of the 1980s, and which were influenced by Crozier's visit in 1969 to Auschwitz and Belsen

Based in London throughout the 1960s and 1970s, Crozier exhibited his works in London, Glasgow, Dublin and all over Europe. As many artists of the 1960s did, Crozier combined painting with teaching, first at Bath Academy of Art, (with Howard Hodgkin, Gillian Ayres and Terry Frost), then at the Central School of Art and Design (with William Turnbull and Cecil Collins), at the Studio School in New York and finally at Winchester School of Art where he led a strong centre for painting based on the European tradition. From the 1980s, Crozier's painting blossomed with new freedom and confidence, the result of his giving up teaching and the stimulus provided by his studios in West Cork in Ireland, and in Hampshire in England. His abstract landscapes and still life paintings used sumptuous colour to convey an emotional intensity. To the end of his life, he was endlessly concerned with the challenge of creating a new language in figurative painting.

William Crozier represented the UK and Ireland overseas and was awarded the Premio Lissone in Milan in 1958 and the Oireachtas Gold medal for Painting in Dublin in 1994. In 1991 the Crawford Art Gallery Cork and the Royal Hibernian Academy curated a retrospective of his work. He was elected to Aosdana in 1992 and was elected an honorary member of the Royal Hibernian Academy. In 2005 Crozier celebrated his 75th birthday with a major exhibition in Cork to celebrate the European Capital of Culture. Here Crozier exhibited a selection of his drawing work, providing the first opportunity to see that the master of colour was also an inventive artist in black and white. He celebrated his 80th year with a large exhibition of his current work at the Flowers Galleries, while a concurrent exhibition of his paintings of the 1950s and 60s at the Pyms Gallery, also in London, triggered a reappraisal of his early paintings. Acquisitions of his work by the Tate Gallery and the National Gallery of Ireland quickly followed.

He died peacefully aged 81 at home on 12 July 2011. His funeral service was held in Wickham on 19 July 2011 and in his beloved West Cork on 19 August 2011. He left €184,870 in his will.

== Films ==
Several films have been made about Crozier and his work, such as Gordon Smith's 'William Crozier' for Scottish TV (1970) and 'The Truth About a Painter' directed by Cian O hEigertaigh for RTÉ (1993). Meridian Film UK made two films centred on Crozier and his art: ‘’Charlston’ and ‘Meon Shore’ as part of the series, 'Summer Painting' in 1996, and later ‘The Frame: Jane Bown photographs William Crozier’ in 2000. Crozier contributed his hostile view of Dalí's painting "Christ of Saint John of the Cross" to an episode of the BBC documentary series, The Private Life of a Masterpiece, which analysed the painting in 2005.

== Exhibitions ==
Examples of the artist's work can be seen in most major public and private collections in the British Isles, and in the National Galleries of Ireland, Canada, Poland and Australia, and the Tate Gallery in Britain among many other national collections. He is strongly represented in corporate collections in the UK and Ireland, including BNP Paribas and British Petroleum Plc. William Crozier's work features in all current reference works on 20th-century Irish and Scottish Art.

Work by Crozier can be seen in the following public collections: Aberdeen Art Gallery, The Ulster Museum, City Art Gallery (Birmingham), Huddersfield Art Gallery, The European Commission (Brussels), Museum of Modern Art (Copenhagen), Crawford Municipal Gallery (Cork), Museum of Modern Art (Dallas), Irish Museum of Modern Art (Dublin), Royal Hibernian Academy (Dublin), Office of Public Works (Dublin), Scottish National Gallery of Modern Art (Edinburgh), City Art Gallery (Gdańsk), Victoria and Albert Museum (London), National Gallery of Australia (Melbourne), National Gallery of Canada (Ottawa), and the National Museum (Warsaw).

== Work in collections ==
- Dublin City University:
  - Autumn Fields

== Bibliography ==
- 'William Crozier' ed Crouan, K, with essays by Kennedy, SB and Vann, Philip. Lund Humphries, London 2007. ISBN 978-0-85331-970-2
- 'William Crozier Early Work' Laffan, W, Pyms Gallery, London 2010. ISBN 978-0-9541489-4-2
