= Cordelia Oliver =

Scottish journalist, painter and art critic

- Born: Cordelia McIntyre Patrick; 24 April 1923; Glasgow, Scotland
- Died: 1 December 2009 (aged 86); Glasgow, Scotland
- Occupations: Artist; writer; arts critic

Cordelia Patrick Oliver (24 April 1923 – 1 December 2009) was a Scottish journalist, painter and art critic, noted as an indefatigable promoter of Scottish arts in general and the avant-garde in particular.

== Early life ==
Cordelia McIntyre Patrick was born in Glasgow, the daughter of Robert Patrick and Flora Matchett McCallum. Her father was a merchant navy officer and marine engineer from the Mull of Kintyre. She was educated at Hutchesons' Grammar School and the Glasgow School of Art.

Oliver attended the Glasgow School of Art during World War II. "In the early war years the school had begun to shrink in numbers, staff as well as students being called up for war service," she recalled. "So we juniors could recognise and name most of the older students since we all ate in the same refectory. Even in the early war years the school was greatly enlivened by the occasional presence of conscripted former students on leave." While she was an art student, she was also a volunteer firefighter at night.

== Career ==
=== Painting ===
Oliver trained as a painter and was most known as a portrait artist. She taught evening classes at the Glasgow School of Art, and taught art at the Craigholme School. She exhibited at the Society of Scottish Artists and at the Royal Scottish Academy. She was a founding board member of the Third Eye Centre in Glasgow, and curated exhibitions there. Her work is in the collection of the National Galleries of Scotland.

=== Writing ===
Beginning in 1963, Oliver wrote for over 25 years as The Guardian's Scottish arts correspondent, reporting the "optimism" she saw in the country's theatre, opera, music, painting and sculpture. She was one of number of figures who were instrumental in establishing a body of critical writing on contemporary art in the 1960s and 1970s. Cordelia Oliver also wrote books and exhibition catalogue essays, including works on Joan Eardley, Jessie M King, and Bet Low. She was known as a particular supporter of women artists, including Margot Sandeman, Winifred Nicholson, Pat Douthwaite, and embroiderer Kathleen Mann. She also promoted the work of Romanian artist Paul Neagu, and was a "great supporter" of the Citizen's Theatre.

In 2005 she gave an oral history interview to the Scottish Oral History Centre at the University of Strathclyde.

== Selected publications ==
- Jessie M. King, 1875-1949 (1971)
- James Cowie: The Artist at Work (1981)
- Jack Knox: Paintings and drawings, 1960-83 (1983)
- Glasgow Citizens' Theatre, Robert David MacDonald and German drama (lecture, 1984)
- It is a Curious Story: The Tale of Scottish Opera, 1962–1987 (1987)
- Joan Eardley, RSA (1988)
- The seeing eye: The life and work of George Oliver (1998)
- George Wyllie: Sculpture Jubilee, 1966-91
- Magic in the Gorbals: A Personal Record of the Citizens Theatre (1999)

== Personal life ==
Cordelia Patrick married photographer George Arthur Oliver; they hosted social gatherings at their home in Pollokshields, traveled together and sometimes covered arts events together. She was widowed in 1990, and she died in 2009, in Glasgow, aged 86 years. The George and Cordelia Oliver Archive is housed at the Glasgow School of Art. There is also a George and Cordelia Oliver undergraduate scholarship at the Glasgow School of Art.
