= Joan Eardley =

British artist (1921–1963)

- Self-portrait, 1943
- Born: Joan Kathleen Harding Eardley; 18 May 1921; Warnham, West Sussex, England.
- Died: 16 August 1963 (aged 42); Killearn Hospital
- Education: Glasgow School of Art
- Awards: Sir James Guthrie Prize
- Elected: Royal Scottish Academy (1963)

Joan Kathleen Harding Eardley (18 May 1921 – 16 August 1963) was a British artist noted for her portraiture of street children in Glasgow and for her landscapes of the fishing village of Catterline and surroundings on the North-East coast of Scotland. One of Scotland's most enduringly popular artists, her career was cut short by breast cancer. Her artistic career had three distinct phases. The first was from 1940 when she enrolled at the Glasgow School of Art through to 1949 when she had a successful exhibition of paintings created while travelling in Italy. From 1950 to 1957, Eardley's work focused on the city of Glasgow and in particular the slum area of Townhead. In the late 1950s, while still living in Glasgow, she spent much time in Catterline before moving there permanently in 1961. During the last years of her life, seascapes and landscapes painted in and around Catterline dominated her output.

== Biography ==
=== Early life ===
Joan Eardley was born at Bailing Hill Farm in Warnham, Sussex, where her parents were dairy farmers. Her mother, Irene Helen Morrison, (1891–1991), was Scottish and had met Captain William Edwin Eardley, (1887–1929), during World War One when he was stationed in Glasgow. Later in the war he fought in the trenches on the Western Front, was wounded in a gas attack and suffered shell-shock. The couple married at the end of the war, but Captain Eardley experienced episodes of depression and suffered a mental breakdown during Joan's early childhood. After the failure, and subsequent sale, of his farm in 1926, Captain Eardley worked for the Ministry of Agriculture and Joan's mother took her and her younger sister, Pat, (1922–2013), to live with her own mother in Blackheath, London. In 1929 an aunt paid for Joan and Pat's education at a private school, St Helen's School, where Joan's artistic talent was first recognised. In 1929 Captain Eardley died by suicide, although the details of his death were not explained to Joan and Pat until they were in their teens, years later.

Eardley trained at the local art school in Blackheath for two terms, and in 1938 enrolled at Goldsmiths College which she attended for one term. In 1939 Eardley, her mother and her sister moved to Glasgow to live with her mother's relatives in Bearsden, after a short period with other relatives in Auchterarder.

=== Glasgow 1940–1948 ===
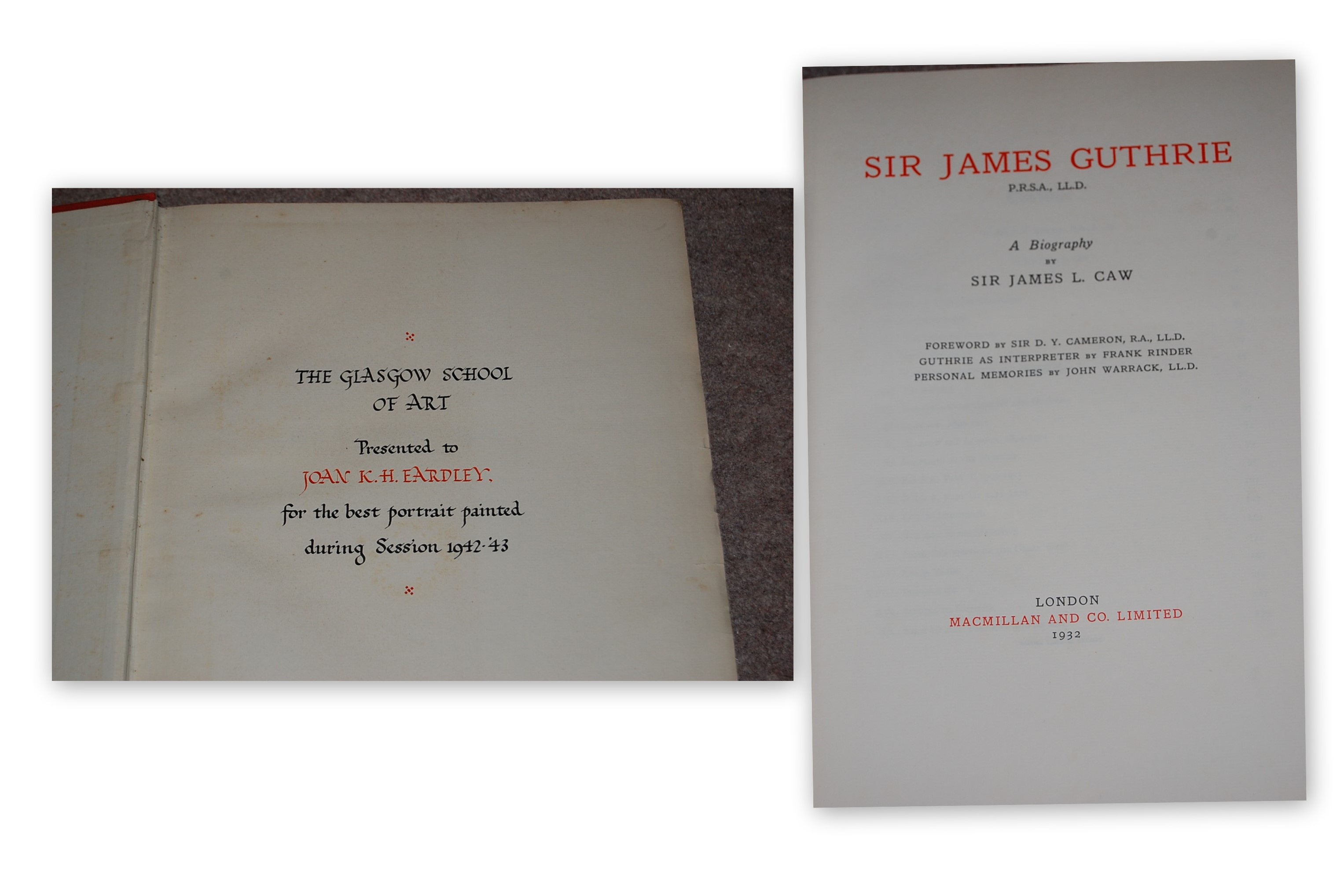
Eardley's Sir James Guthrie prize

In January 1940 Eardley enrolled at the Glasgow School of Art as a day student where she studied under Hugh Adam Crawford and was influenced by the Scottish Colourists. The work of the Polish artist Josef Herman, who arrived in Glasgow in 1940 and met Eardley, was also an influence. She met the painter Margot Sandeman, who became a close and lifelong friend. Sandeman and Eardley would often paint together and also shared family holidays and camping trips. In 1941, they acquired a horse and caravan and travelled around Loch Lomond to paint and sketch. For many years, they also visited Corrie on the Isle of Arran, using an outhouse, "The Tabernacle", as a studio.

By 1942, Eardley had completed the School of Art's General Course and began the diploma course in drawing and painting. The next year she was awarded the diploma in drawing and painting. Her diploma painting, a self-portrait in oil on plyboard, is her only extant example of formal portraiture and she was awarded the school's Sir James Guthrie Prize for it. Her tutor Hugh Adam Crawford recognised her talent and bought the work to hang in his home. Her biographer Christopher Andreae notes it as nevertheless a remarkably informal picture, a precursor to the charcoal studies she made in Italy and these in turn a preparation for her many drawing, pastels and paintings of Glasgow street children. The prize, a biography of Guthrie by Sir James L. Caw and published by Macmillan & Co. of London in 1932, is still in the possession of Eardley's family.

After graduating in 1943 Eardley trained as a teacher at Jordanhill Teacher Training College, but she never liked classroom teaching and left after one term. She chose instead to work as a joiner's apprentice with a small boat building firm in Bearsden. This work, which, throughout 1944 included painting camouflage patterns on landing craft for the war effort, allowed Eardley to attend evening classes at the Glasgow School of Art until 1946. During the war, her painting of her shipyard work mates, The Mixer Men, was shown at Royal Glasgow Institute of the Fine Arts. Around 1945 Eardley appears to have made a small number of prints using a wood engraving technique but did not continue with the method. Eardley went back to London for a short time and, during 1947, spent time in Lincoln working on a mural commission for a school. She returned to Scotland to continue her studies in 1947 at Hospitalfield House, in Arbroath under James Cowie, who influenced her choice of everyday subject matter. In 1948 Eardley returned to the Glasgow School of Art to complete a post-diploma course.

=== Italy 1949 ===
Beggars in Venice, 1949. Oil on canvas, 90.5 by 96 cm. Private collection

In 1948 the Royal Scottish Academy awarded Eardley a Carnegie scholarship which, together with a travelling scholarship from the Glasgow School of Art, allowed her to visit Italy and, briefly, Paris for several months in 1948 and 1949. In September 1948 she travelled by boat and train to Florence. There she saw many works by Italian Renaissance artists and in particular she admired fresco cycles by Giotto, by Masaccio in the Brancacci Chapel and also works by Piero della Francesca. She valued these artists' humanity and the sculptural aspects of their work. She visited churches and monasteries in Assisi before visiting Forte dei Marmi in November 1948. There she painted fishermen working on their nets, a subject she returned to years later in Catterline. Eardley spent Christmas 1948 in Paris before travelling to Venice in January 1949. In Venice she fell ill and had to travel to Florence for treatment by an English speaking doctor. Once recovered, she divided her time between Arezzo, Ravenna as well as Florence and Venice.

Early in her trip, Eardley had destroyed all but one of the paintings she had made by that stage, but back in Venice she painted, and retained, a number of works. During her stay in Venice in 1949 Eardley worked mainly in charcoal and pastel. Beggars in Venice is an example of the few oil paintings she produced at the time. The intense blue reflects the love for Giotto she developed during her time to Italy. The location shown is the Campo SS Giovanni e Paolo, a large square in Venice. The building depicted is the Scuola Grande di San Marco, built in the fifteenth century as a great philanthropic confraternity. Walter Sickert painted exactly the same view in his The Scuola Grande di San Marco. Eardley portrays the beggars gathered there with the same tenderness and sympathy she was later to bring to bear portraying the lives of the disenfranchised in the tenements of Glasgow. The painting realized £169,250 at a Sotheby's London sale on 26 August 2008. On her return to Scotland in 1949 she mounted an exhibition, effectively her first solo exhibition, of work done in Italy, including a number of striking scenes of peasants, beggars, children and old women. The exhibition, at the Mackintosh Gallery of the Glasgow School of Art, met with considerable praise and several of the works shown were acquired by the Aberdeen Art Gallery and for the Glasgow School of Art's own collection.

=== Townhead 1950–1957 ===
In 1949 Eardley set up a studio in Glasgow, in the deprived and overcrowded Townhead area, all of which was earmarked for demolition at the time. Her first studio was on the fourth floor of a tenement building in Cochrane Street but she later moved to a space above a scrap metal store on St James Road, when the area was regenerated and the studio lost; something Eardley regretted as it was 'so easy to get the slum children to come up. And I have become known in the district'. In Townhead her drawings and paintings were known to be of the poorest city children, often playing in the streets in ragged clothes, the older girls looking after younger siblings. While some of the children appear quite introspective, Eardley captured the exuberance and awkwardness of most of the children. The twelve children of the Samson family were among her regular subjects. Eardley also made chalk drawings, often on scraps of paper or even bits of sandpaper, of the tenement children. These images became the basis of several oil paintings of groups of children. The sense of kinship and community feeling Eardley experienced in Townhead is evident in pictures such as Street Kids, in Glasgow Kids, A Saturday Matinee Picture Queue and in Children, Port Glasgow. These paintings are characterized by their bold use of textured layers of paint. She said that although thinking of the way they 'let out their life and energy...in painterly terms' .. colour and bits of clothes...even that doesn't matter..they are Glasgow – this richness that Glasgow has – I hope it will always have – a living thing...as long as Glasgow has this I'll always want to paint'. In other paintings from this time Eardley used collage, incorporating scraps of newspapers and sweet wrappers, along with elements of graffiti and shop signs, often from abandoned shopfronts.

After the move to St James Road, Eardley began using photographs to record subjects she would later paint. As well as her own photographs, the photographer Audrey Walker (not the textile artist of the same name) also worked alongside her and supplied her with material. Walker also photographed Eardley at work. Documentary photographer Oscar Marzaroli admired her art, and took pictures of the Samson family in her studio. Eardley also drew numerous scenes of the shipyards of Port Glasgow. She developed a unique style and soon had a reputation as a highly individual, realistic and humane artist of urban life. She was often to be seen transporting her easel and paints around Glasgow in an old pram.

=== Catterline 1957–1963 ===
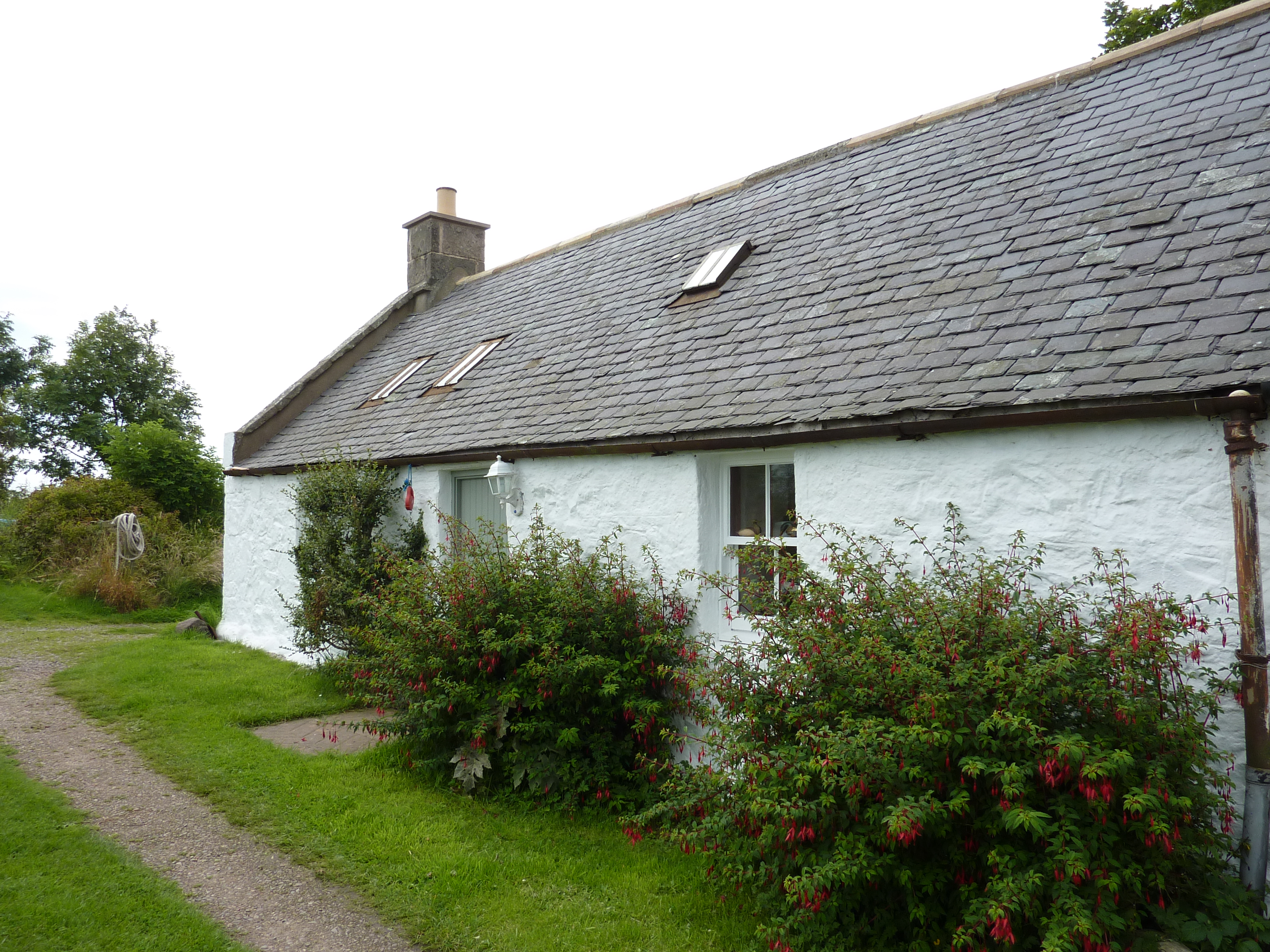
Joan Eardley lived and worked in this cottage in Catterline, Aberdeenshire in the years before her death in 1963.

In the spring of 1950, while convalescing from mumps, Eardley was taken by a friend, Annette Soper, (later Annette Stephen by marriage), to visit Catterline, a fishing village near Stonehaven, south of Aberdeen, where Eardley had an exhibition at the time. Eardley started to spend part of each year away from Glasgow in Catterline, until 1961 when the small village became her permanent home. At first Eardley worked from Watch House, a former Coast-guard property which Soper had bought and allowed Eardley the free run of. In 1955 Eardley bought Number 1, The Row, a cottage on the cliff edge which she used as a home and studio until 1955 when she bought Number 18, The Row, while retaining Number 1, The Row as her picture store. Number 18 was more suitable for living in, but was still a very basic cottage without electricity, running water or sanitation. She called it "a great wee house....I am sitting looking out at the darkness and the sea. I think I shall paint here. This is a strange place – it always excited me."

In her first years at Catterline, Eardley concentrated on painting the surrounding fields and cottages, only starting to paint beach and seascapes some time later. For both her seascapes and landscapes, Eardley created series of works, often showing the same view but in different light and weather conditions, including in storm conditions. She painted landscapes showing the changing seasons in the fields around the village, her thickly textured paintwork sometimes incorporating real pieces of vegetation. To Summer Fields (c.1961) Eardley added grass pieces to the paint surface while Harvest (1960–61) includes elements of grit. She usually worked outdoors and often in poor weather, sometimes in snowstorms or gale-force winds. The Wave from February 1961, for example described as her 'breakthrough' work, was painted entirely in the open air and was one of four paintings she created during a particular storm, the state of the tides determining which of the four she would work on at any given time. When she heard of a storm approaching the coast, Eardley would travel by train from Glasgow to Stonehaven and then ride her Lambretta to Catterline. For her seascapes Eardley switched from painting on canvas to using large boards, for a more rigid surface to work on, some of which were as large as six feet in length.

In an audio recording Eardley spoke of Catterline: "When I'm painting in the North East, I hardly ever move out of the village (Catterline), I hardly ever move from one spot. I do feel the more you know something, the more you can get out of it. That is the North East. It's just vast (indistinct word possibly "waves"), vast seas, vast areas of cliff. Well you've just got to paint it."

In 1955 Eardley became an associate of the Royal Scottish Academy and in 1963 she was elected a full member of the academy. The same year an exhibition of her work was held in London, but she was too ill to attend.

=== Death ===
Early in 1963, Eardley consulted a homeopathic doctor about a breast lump but was told she had no need to be concerned. By May 1963, she was complaining of persistent headaches and was diagnosed with breast cancer that had spread to her brain. Eardley was cared for by friends at Catterline throughout her last months and died at Killearn Hospital in August 1963 at the age of 42, with her mother, sister and Audrey Walker at her bedside. A large painting of the Samson sisters, Two Children, was left unfinished in her studio, as she had kept on working until she lost her eyesight. Her ashes were scattered on Catterline beach.

== Personal life ==
In 2013, a collection of letters written by Eardley to Audrey Walker were released, having been placed under an embargo by Walker until decades after she had died. Eardley had first met Walker, who was ten years older than her and was married to a prominent Scottish barrister, in 1952 in Glasgow. When the two were not together, Eardley would write to Walker on a near daily basis and the letters show Eardley's intense love for Walker. Although the letters were released with the agreement of both the Eardley and Walker family estates, their publication was criticized in some quarters.

== Legacy ==
Eardley's work was already highly acclaimed by many in Britain by the time of her death. She had produced over 300 paintings and 1400 sketches, now in galleries or private collections. Posthumously, she has been recognised as an artist of international importance, although not universally. A retrospective exhibition held in Edinburgh in 1988 was hosted by the Talbot Rice Gallery and the Royal Scottish Academy, the then director of the National Galleries of Scotland having declined the opportunity to mark the 25th anniversary of her death. A National Galleries of Scotland retrospective was finally held in 2007–2008. The Scottish National Gallery of Modern Art has many of her works, as do the Glasgow Museums, which hold both coastal landscapes such as Catterline Coastal Cottages (c. 1952) and figurative paintings such as Two Children from 1963.

According to Dr Janet McKenzie of the National Galleries of Scotland, Eardley's untimely death "meant that she was never given the stature she deserved. Her work deserves to be compared to Frank Auerbach, David Bomberg, Lucian Freud". For Guy Peploe "There was a desperate urgency to her work. It was almost as if she knew that she was not going to be the grand lady of Scottish art". Murdo Macdonald says of Eardley's Catterline seascapes: "[S]he committed herself to understanding the sea more than any other painter since William McTaggart in the 1890s. Rather than just responding to the attraction of the coastline, she painted with the perception of a mariner aware that waves are heavy, fast moving lumps of water, as able to kill as to support. In this she reinvigorated a maritime trend in Scottish art..." One of her biographers, Cordelia Oliver, observed that "for her a truly successful painting had to go deeper than a mere visual record, no matter how accurate... [H]er success lay in her ability to combine the acute, uncompromising painter's eye with a warm human sympathy and understanding".

In 2017, Historic Environment Scotland awarded a plaque to commemorate Eardley. It can be found at No. 1 South Row, Catterline, Stonehaven.

In 2026, a lost Eardley painting Summer Fields (c. 1961), discovered in an East Midlands charity shop, was sold for £29,500 following its authentication by The Scottish Gallery which had originally sold the work.

== Memberships ==
Eardley was a member of or affiliated with the following organisations:

- 1948: Professional member of the Society of Scottish Artists
- 1955: Elected Associate of the Royal Scottish Academy
- 1963: Elected full member of the Royal Scottish Academy
- 1963: Honorary member of Glasgow Society of Lady Artists' Club

== Exhibitions ==
Exhibitions of her work held during Eardley's life included:

- 1948: An Exhibition of Paintings and Drawings of Italy made by a Travelling Scholar at the School, Joan Eardley, Glasgow
- 1950, Solo exhibition, Gaumont Gallery, Aberdeen
- 1959: Solo exhibition, 57 Gallery, Edinburgh
- 1961: Solo exhibition, the Scottish Gallery, Edinburgh
- 1963: Solo exhibition, Roland, Browse & Delbranco Gallery, London

=== Posthumous exhibitions ===
- 1964: Joan Eardley Memorial Exhibition, Kelvingrove Art Gallery and Museum then at the Royal Scottish Academy, Edinburgh.
- 2007: Retrospective, National Galleries of Scotland, Edinburgh
- 2007: Retrospective, the Scottish Gallery, Edinburgh
- 2008: Retrospective, the Fleming Gallery, London
- 2014: Refiguring the 50s, group exhibition, Ben Uri Gallery, London
- 2015: Joan Eardley: Time and Tide, Clydebank Museum and Art Gallery
- 2017: Joan Eardley: A Sense of Place, Scottish National Gallery of Modern Art, Edinburgh
- 2021: a series of exhibitions and events to mark the centenary of her birth.
- 2026: Joan Eardley: The Nature of Painting, National Galleries of Scotland
