= Jack Simcock =

British painter

Jack Simcock (6 June 1929-13 May 2012) was a British painter. He was born to a mining family in Biddulph, Staffordshire and studied at Burslem School of Art. He is best known for "a long series of bleak, sombre oils on board" of the Mow Cop area in which he lived for much of his life. Reginald Haggar highlighted the "richness of colour that underlies the seemingly black and white effects, glints of terracotta and old gold through steely grey" in a Sentinel article of 1963.

Simcock started exhibiting at London's Piccadilly Gallery from 1957 after encouragement from Arthur Berry and went on to have more than fifty solo shows worldwide. His work is in various public collections in the UK which can be viewed through the Art UK website.

Simcock's autobiography, Simcock, Mow Cop (1975) discusses his life, his beliefs and his artistic preferences. In the same year, Simcock also published a book of poetry entitled Midnight Till Three.

He died on the eve of the opening of "The Boys", an exhibition at Keele University, of his paintings, together with those of his fellow Burslem School of Art alumni, Enos Lovatt and Arthur Berry.
