= Hugh Adam Crawford =

Scottish artist (1898–1982)

Hugh Adam Crawford RSA
- Born: 28 October 1898; Busby, East Renfrewshire, Scotland
- Died: 1982 (aged 83–84)
- Education: Glasgow School of Art; Central School of Art; Saint Martin's School of Art
- Known for: Painting

Hugh Adam Crawford, RSA (28 October 1898 – 1982), was a Scottish artist and oil painter, mostly of portraits and figures, who was an influential and charismatic figure in the 1930s Glasgow art scene. During a long teaching career, Crawford influenced and inspired many notable students including Joan Eardley, Robert MacBryde and Robert Colquhoun.

== Biography ==
Crawford was born in Busby, East Renfrewshire and studied at the Glasgow School of Art, where he was taught by Maurice Greiffenhagen from 1919 to 1923. He briefly moved to London to study part-time at the Central School of Art and at Saint Martin's School of Art. He then returned to Glasgow in 1925 to join the staff at the Glasgow School of Art. He eventually became Head of Painting there, a post he was to hold until 1948. As well as developing a strong style of portrait painting Crawford also painted murals, notably for a Roman Catholic chapel at Bellahouston and St Columba's Church in Glasgow. He also completed murals at the John Brown & Company shipyard and at the Scottish Brewers premises in Glasgow.

When Crawford's depiction of wartime casualties, Tribute to Clydebank (The Stretcher Bearers) was shown at the Royal Academy in 1942 it was declared 'picture of the year' and he considered it his best work. Also during World War Two, Crawford received a short-term commission from the War Artists' Advisory Committee for three portraits. The first, in May 1941, was for a portrait of the Lord Provost of Glasgow. This was followed by a subject for the Ministry of Home Security in February 1942 and finally a portrait of a Company Sergeant-Major in the Seaforth Highlanders which was completed in May 1942.

When Crawford left the Glasgow School of Art in 1948 he became Head of Gray's School of Art until 1954 when he was appointed Principal of the Duncan of Jordonstone College of Art in Dundee, a post he retired from in 1964. He was elected an Associate of the Royal Scottish Academy in 1938 and became a full member in 1956.
