= Benno Schotz =

Estonian-Scottish sculptor

- Benno Schotz in 1949, taken by Lida Moser
- Born: 28 August 1891; Arensburg, Livonia, Russian Empire
- Died: 11 October 1984 (aged 93); Glasgow, Scotland
- Resting place: Jerusalem
- Education: Royal Technical College, Glasgow School of Art
- Known for: Sculptor

Benno Schotz (28 August 1891 – 11 October 1984) was an Estonian-born Scottish sculptor, and one of Scotland's leading artists during the twentieth century.

== Biography ==
=== Early life ===
Schotz was the youngest of six children of Jewish parents, Jacob Schotz, a watchmaker, and Cherna Tischa Abramovitch. He was educated at the Boys Grammar School of Pärnu, Estonia. Later he studied at the Grossherzogliche Technische Hochschule in Darmstadt, Germany.

In 1912, he immigrated to Glasgow, where he gained an engineering diploma from the Royal Technical College. From 1914 to 1923 he worked in the drawing office of John Brown & Company, Clydebank shipbuilders, while attending evening classes in sculpture at the Glasgow School of Art.

=== Artistic career ===
Schotz became a full-time sculptor in 1923. An important early patron was the Dundee art collector William Boyd, thanks to whose influence both Dundee Dental School and Dundee Art Galleries & Museums hold pieces by him. From this point onwards his reputation grew and he became a full member of the Royal Scottish Academy in 1937, head of sculpture at the Glasgow School of Art (a post he held from 1938 until his retirement in 1961), and eventually was appointed the Sculptor in Ordinary for Scotland in 1963. His pupils included the artists Hannah Frank, Stewart Bowman Johnson, and Inge King (née Neufeld).

His homes at West Campbell Street and later Kirklee Road were a focus for meetings of artists, writers, actors, and politicians. He was a member of the Glasgow Art Club. He helped refugees including Jankel Adler and Josef Herman and was chair of the Festival of Jewish Arts in Glasgow in 1951.

He was a committed Zionist, and also proud of his adopted Scotland. He worked until a few weeks before his death at the age of 93. He was buried in Jerusalem.

He was made a Freeman of the City of Glasgow in 1981. In that year, Gordon Wright published his autobiography, Bronze in My Blood.

== Work ==
During his career, Schotz produced several hundred portraits and compositions including figure compositions, religious sculptures, semi-abstracts, and modelled portraits. His bust of James Maxton is on public display at the Maxton remembrance garden in Barrhead near Paisley. Other publicly accessible work includes:

- Memorial to Provost John Jarvie of Kilsyth, first freeman of the burgh, commissioned in 1954 is a portrait in relief and can be seen in John Jarvie Square, off East Burnside Street, Kilsyth.
- The Psalmist (1974) in the T. J. Honeyman Memorial Garden of Kelvingrove Park,
- the Joseph Black Memorial (1953) at the University of Glasgow,
- the statues of Saints Margaret and Ninian on the front of the 1929-31 (former) Bank of Scotland building on Sauchiehall St,
- the Painting and Sculpture reliefs on the Mercat Building (1928–29) and
- the Stations of the Cross sculptures in St. Charles' Parish Church North Kelvinside.
- the Crucifix in St Columba's Church, Woodside, Glasgow
- Ex Terra in Glenrothes town centre next to the bus station
- bust of James Pittendrigh Macgillivray, Scottish National Portrait Gallery (1924)
- busts of William Boyd, Mrs William Rettie, and William Tattersall in Dundee Dental Hospital & School, University of Dundee
- a bust of William Boyd's daughter Joan at The McManus: Dundee's Art Gallery & Museum,
- The Hunter Memorial, at the Glebe Memorial Garden, East Kilbride (1937),
- bust of Keir Hardie, People's Palace, Glasgow
- eleven foot high sculpture 'The Window on the World', Vale of Leven Academy Alexandria.

The majority of these works were in Glasgow and the surrounding area. He was responsible for the repair of the bridge sculpture at Kelvingrove Park beside the now refurbished art gallery and museum.

== Books ==
- Schotz, Benno (1981). Bronze in my blood : the memoirs of Benno Schotz. Edinburgh, Scotland: G. Wright Pub. ISBN 9780903065375.

== Gallery ==
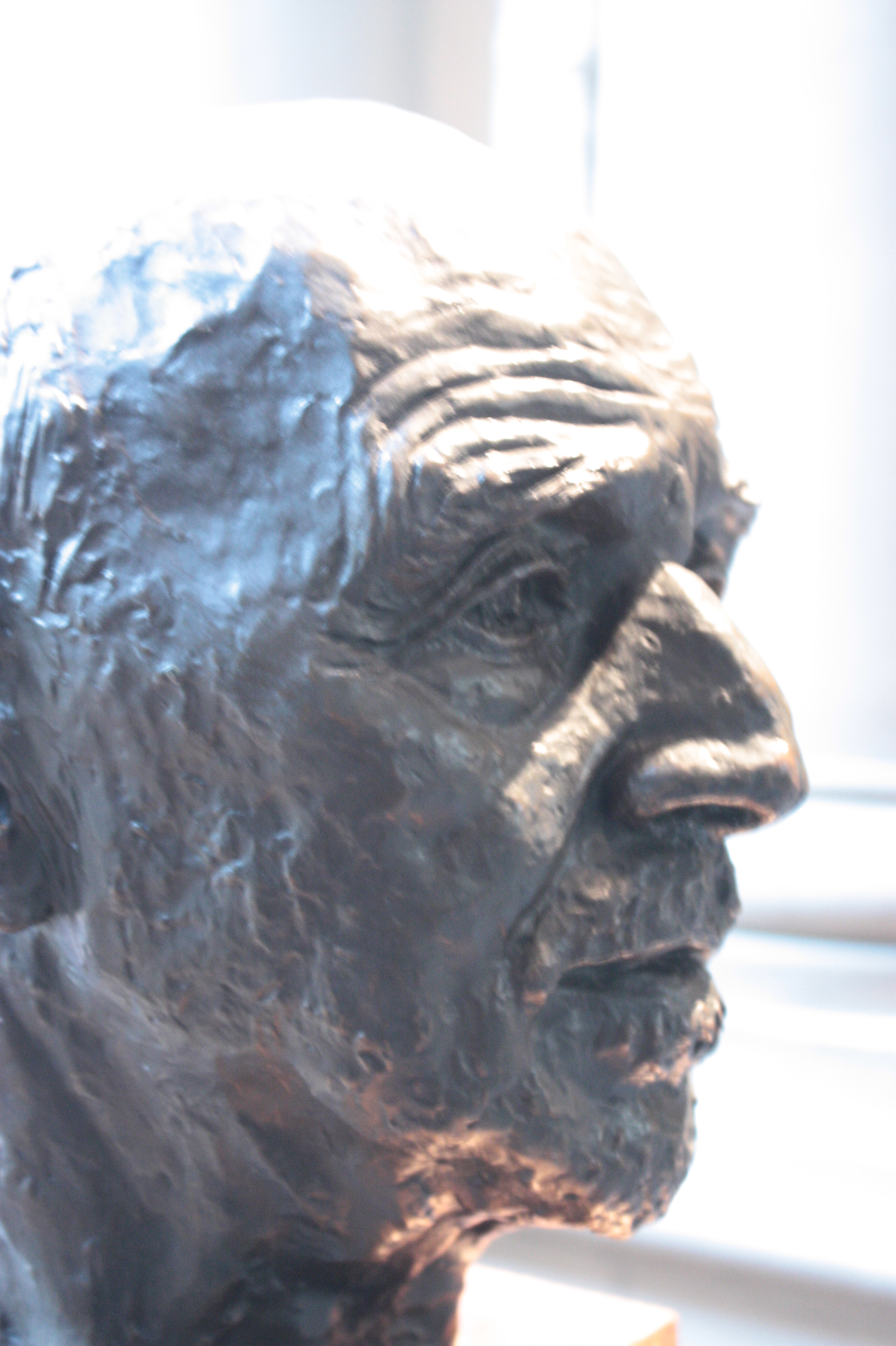
Alexander Reid 1927

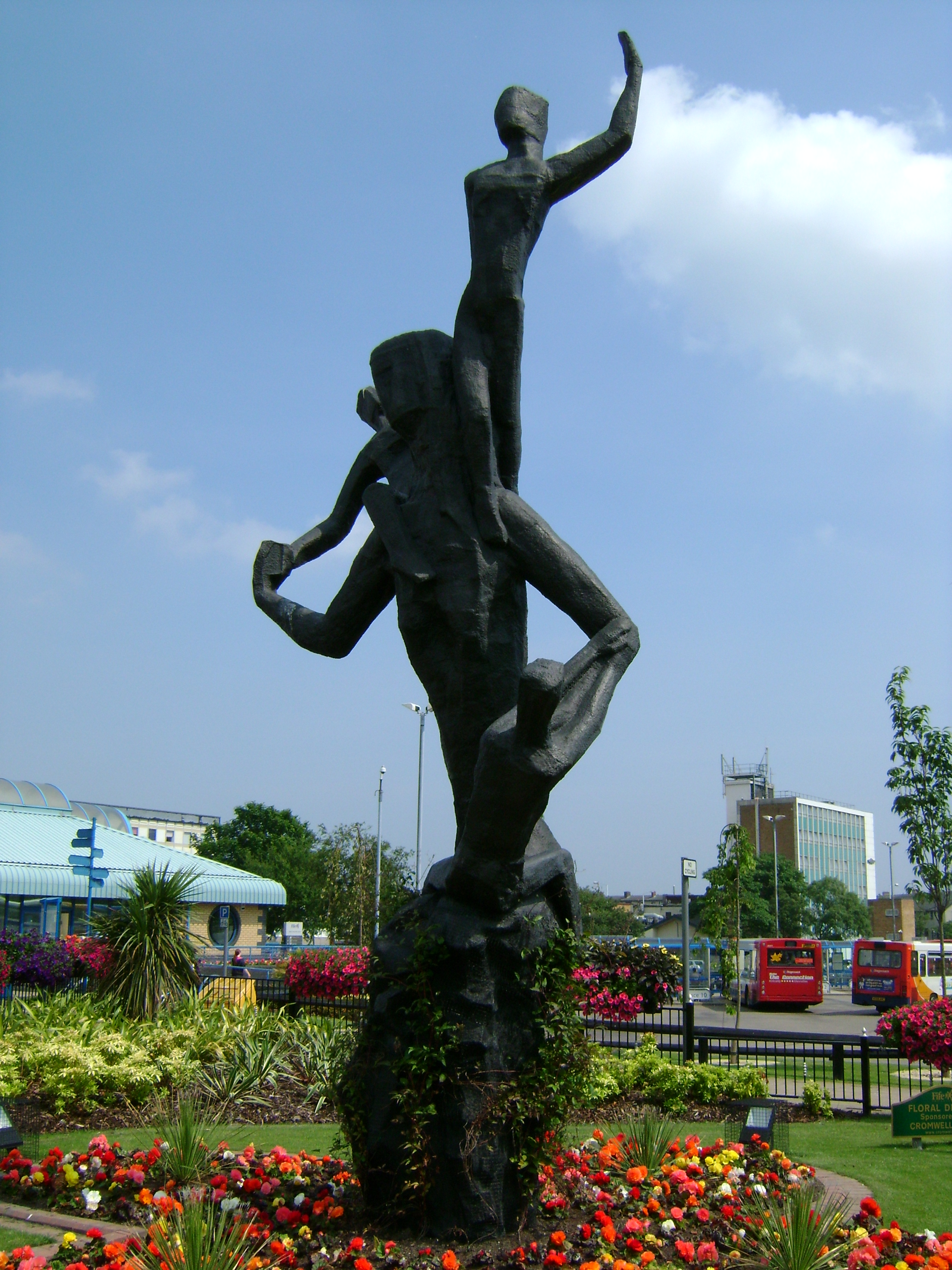
"Ex Terra" 1965

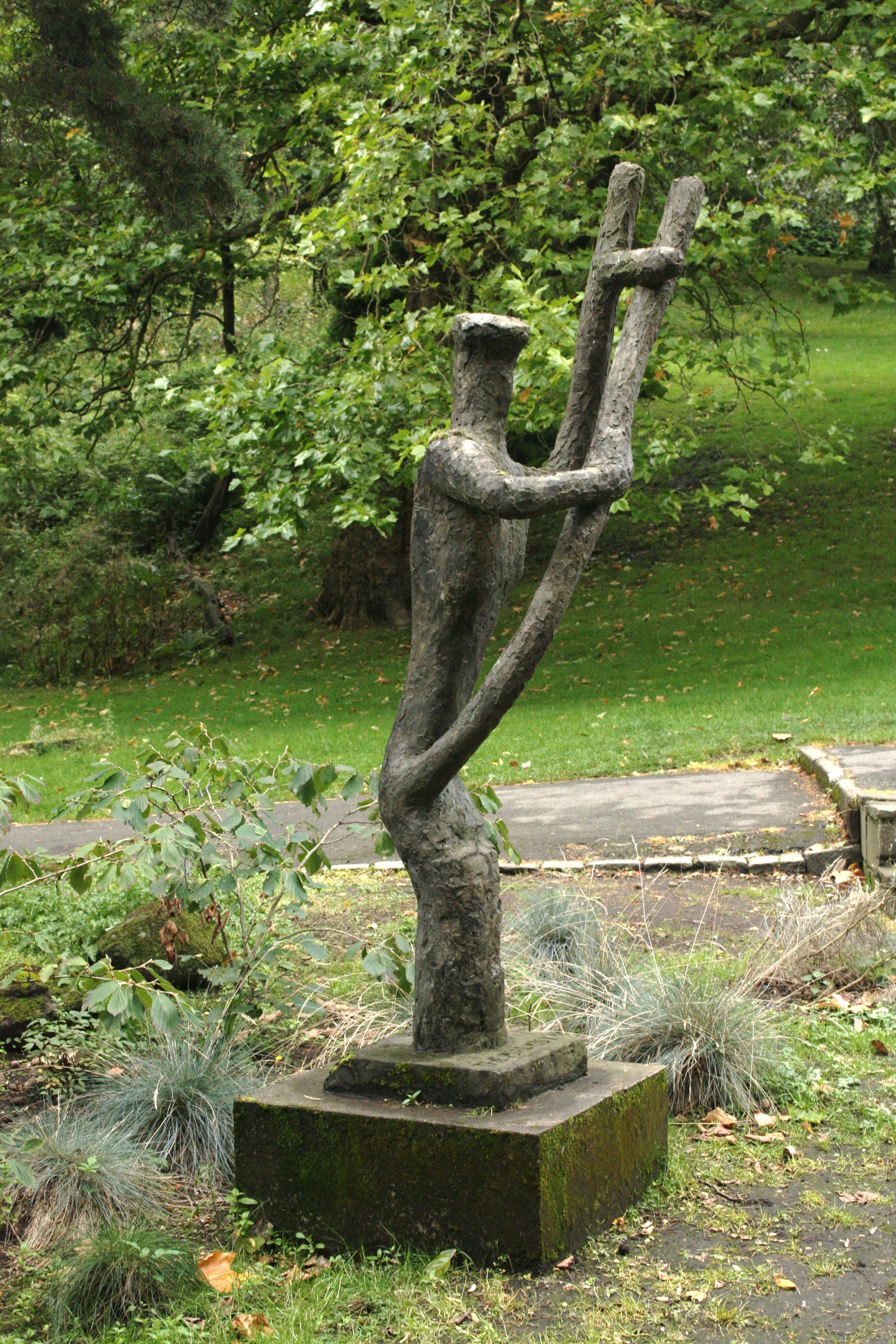
The Psalmist (1974). Kelvingrove Park, Glasgow, Scotland

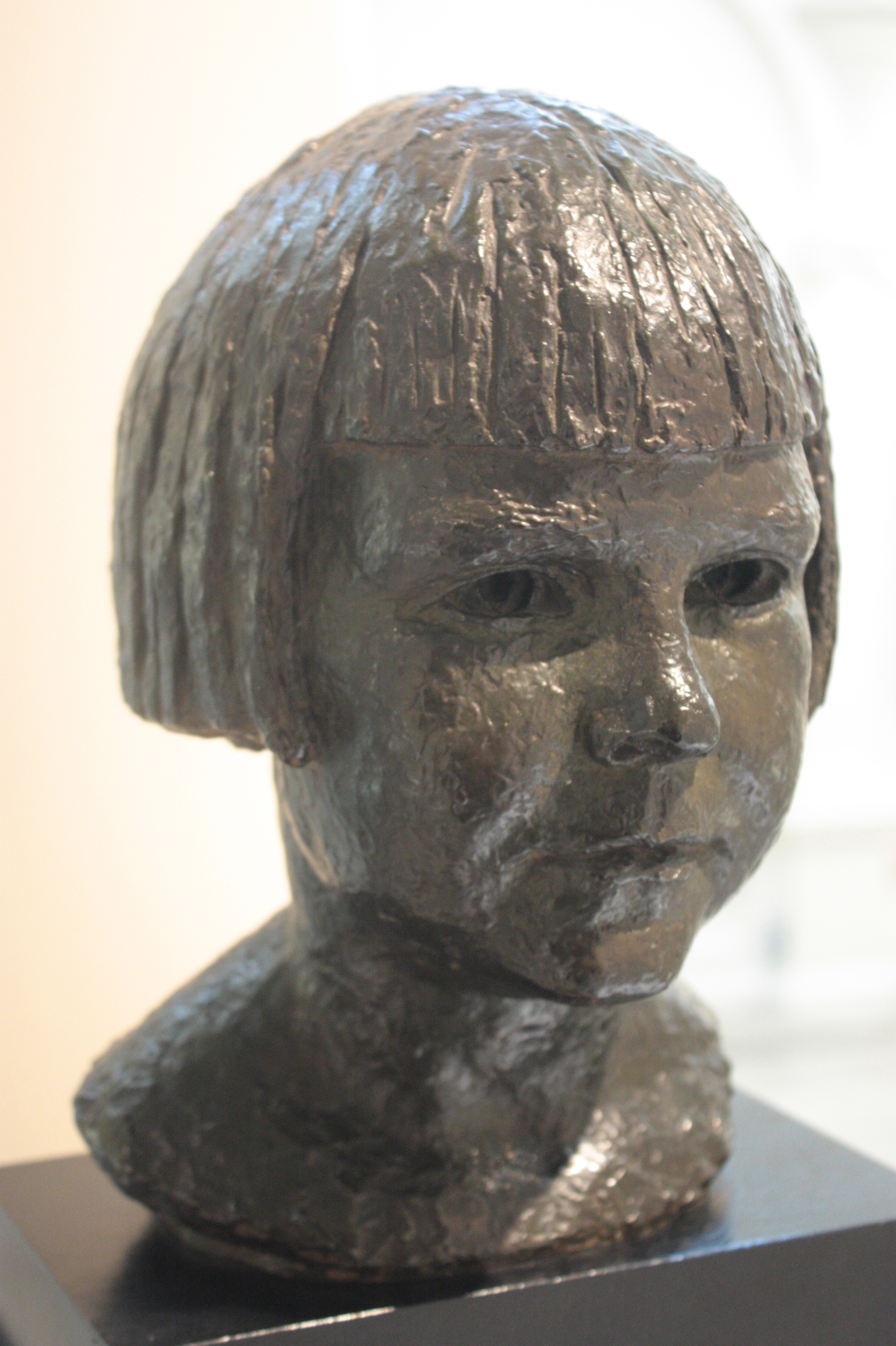
Joan 1933, the McManus, Dundee

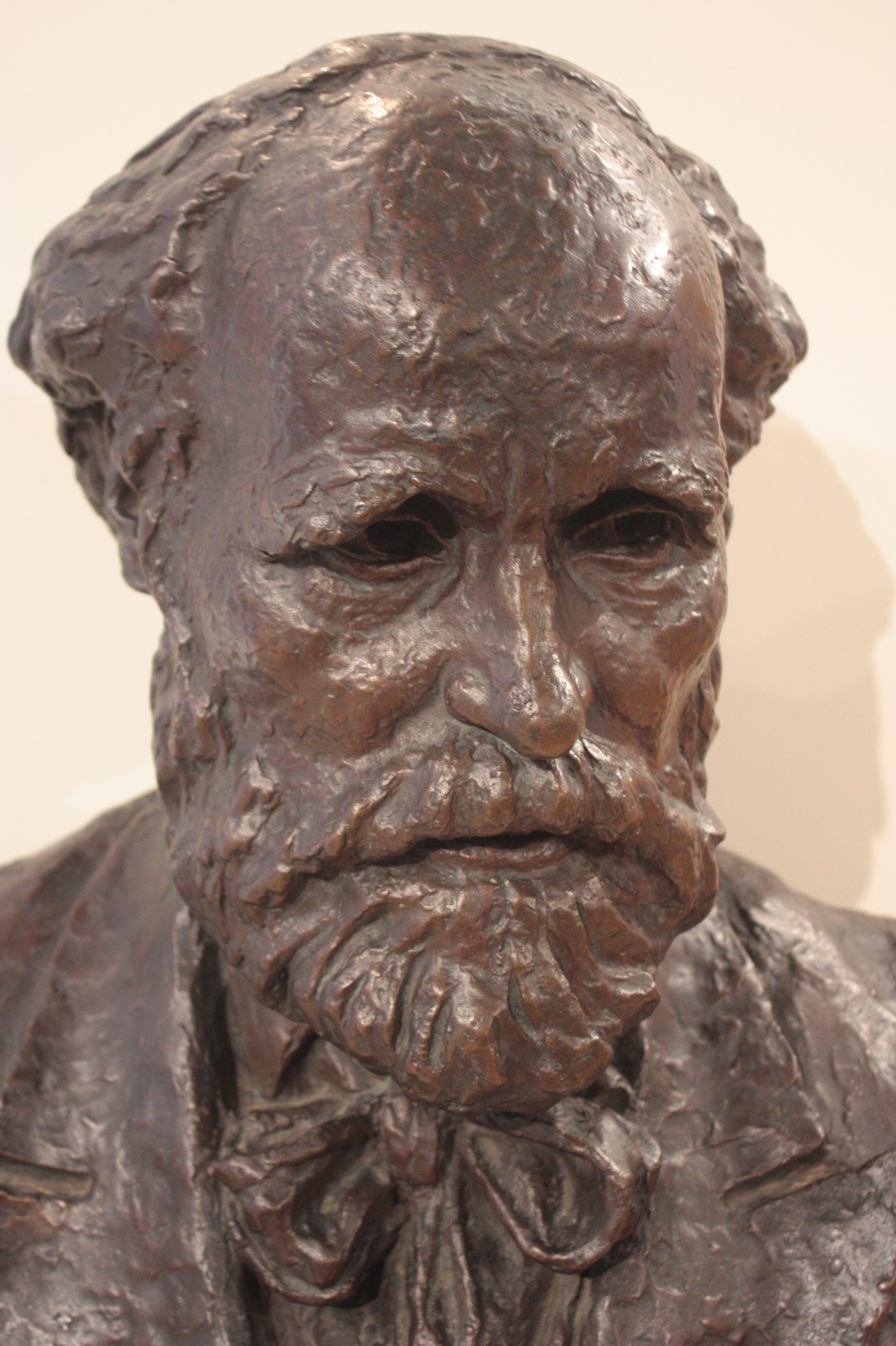
Keir Hardie, Peoples Palace, Glasgow
