= St Columba's Catholic Church, Glasgow =

Coordinates: 55.8764°N 4.2666°W

St Columba's Church
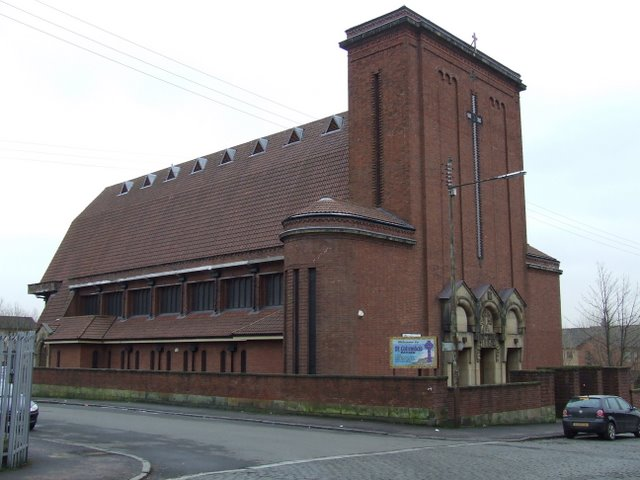

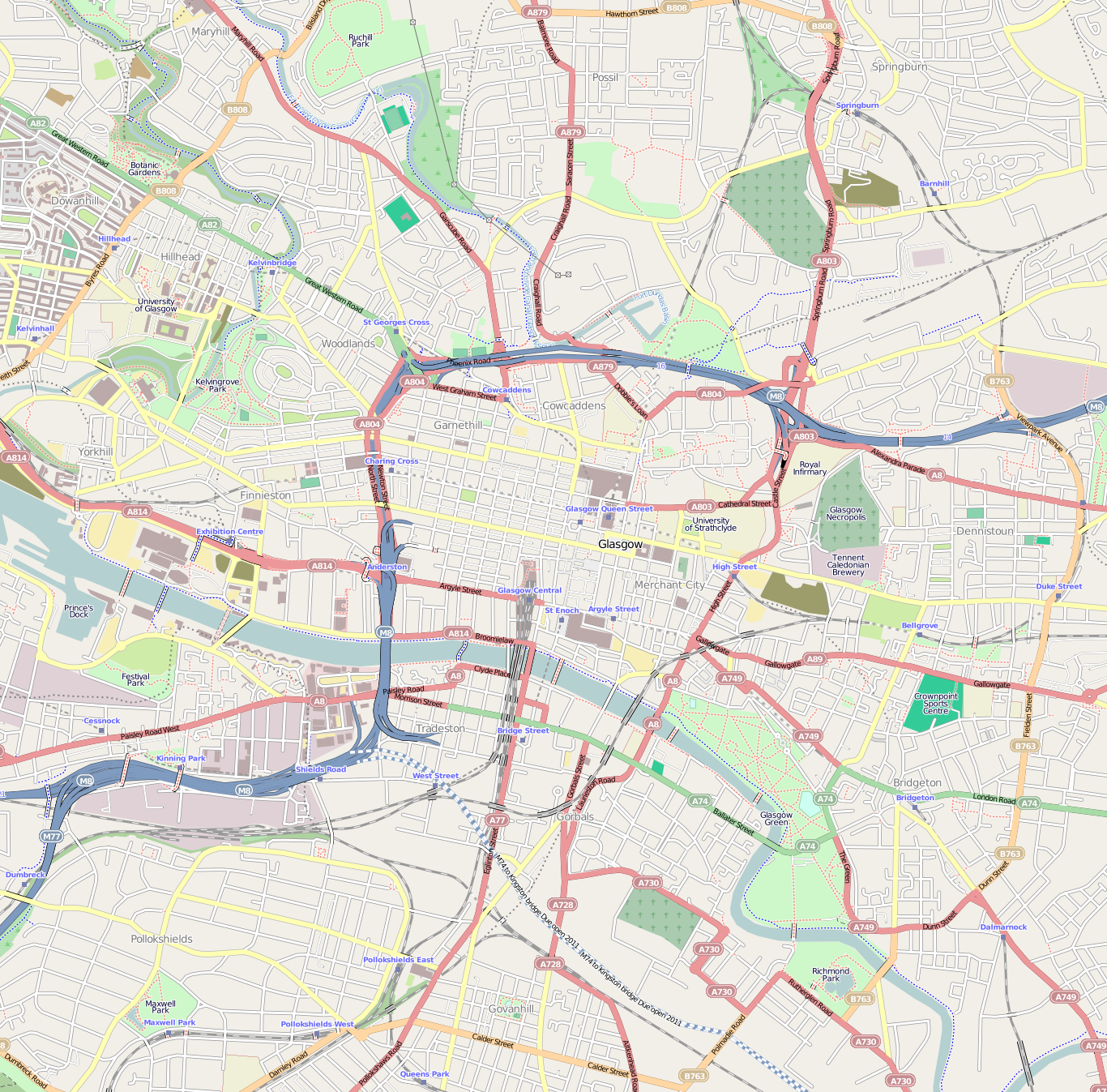
- Location in Glasgow
- Location: Woodside, Glasgow
- Country: Scotland
- Denomination: Roman Catholic

History
- Status: Parish church
- Dedication: Saint Columba

Architecture
- Functional status: Active
- Heritage designation: Category A listed
- Designated: 6 April 1992
- Architect: Gillespie, Kidd & Coia
- Style: Romanesque Revival
- Groundbreaking: 1937
- Completed: 1941

Administration
- Province: Glasgow
- Archdiocese: Glasgow
- Deanery: West End

St Columba's Church is a Roman Catholic Parish church in Woodside, Glasgow, Scotland. It was completed in 1941 and designed by Gillespie, Kidd & Coia. It is situated on Hopehill Road south west of Garscube Road. From 2005 until 2016 it was served by priests from the Dominican Order. Since 2016 it has been served by the Holy Ghost Fathers. It is a category A listed building.

== History ==
On 26 March 1937, a Fr Denis Flynn applied for permission to build a Catholic church in Woodside, Glasgow. Soon after was the 1938 Empire Exhibition in Scotland. In that exhibition was the Catholic Pavilion, which was designed by Jack Coia. He was commissioned to design St Columba's Church. However, construction was halted during the initial years of World War II. In 1941, permission was granted for construction to continue and the church was completed during the Blitz. The cost of constructing of the church was paid by local congregation. Each local family paid 6d for the bricks used in construction. It was the only church to be completed in Glasgow during World War II.

== Architecture ==
The church design is inspired by the Italian Romanesque style with basilica layout. The front of the church, facing west, has a cross-shaped window. While the exterior is made of brick, it is built over a concrete portal frame and has a mansard roof. Over the central door is a sculpture of the Paschal Lamb over central door. The church's Stations of the Cross were painted by Hugh Adam Crawford and came from the Catholic Pavilion at the Empire Exhibition, Scotland. In the sanctuary is a marble reredos with a carved crucifix by Benno Schotz.

== Parish ==
In 2005, the Dominican priests began their service to the parish. They remained in the parish until 2016, when they withdrew from area. In their place, the Holy Ghost Fathers arrived and have served until 7 January 2021, when the Blessed Sacrament Fathers took over the administration of the parish. The Holy Ghost Fathers who went to the south side of the city to be near the Queen Elizabeth University Teaching Hospital of which they also serve as chaplains.

There are five Sunday Masses held in the church at 4:00pm on Saturday, 8:30am, 10:00am, 12:00pm and 5:00pm on Sunday. From Monday to Friday there are Masses at 10:00am and 12:30pm.

== See also ==
- Archdiocese of Glasgow
