= Margot Sandeman =

Scottish painter (1922–2009)

- Born: Margot Sandeman; 27 May 1922; Glasgow, Scotland
- Died: 17 January 2009 (aged 86)
- Education: Glasgow School of Art
- Known for: Painting of West Coast Scottish landscapes
- Notable work: Sheep Resting on the Shore
- Spouse: James Robson
- Awards: Guthrie Award, 1958

Margot Sandeman (27 May 1922 – 17 January 2009) was a Scottish painter, close friend of Joan Eardley and long-time collaborator with poet Ian Hamilton Finlay. She was known for her paintings of West Coast Scottish landscapes, rural settings, interiors and still lives.

== Early life ==
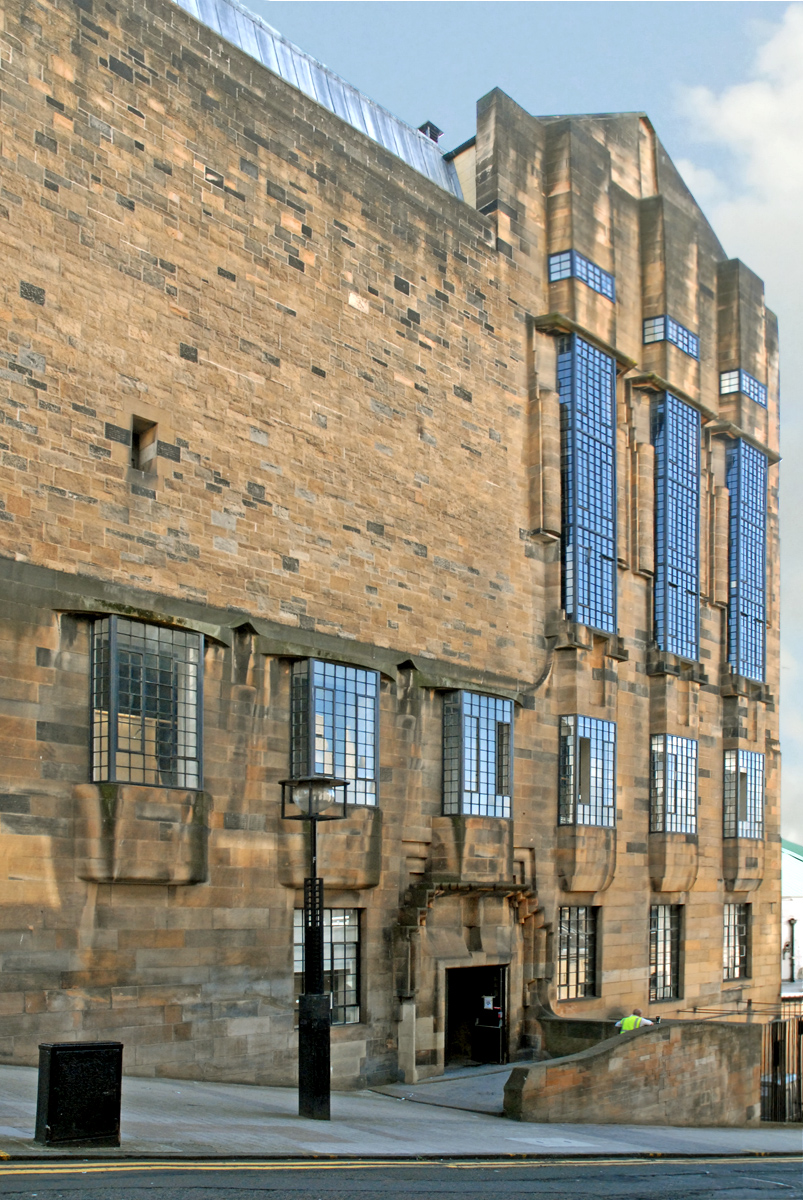
Glasgow School of Art, where Sandeman studied

Margot Sandeman was born in Glasgow to a family of Scottish artists, the daughter of self-taught watercolourist Archibald Sandeman (1887–1941), and internationally known embroiderer Muriel Boyd (1887–1981). Sandeman grew up in Bearsden in a creative household, influenced by William Morris and the Arts and Crafts movement. The family home was decorated by her mother with texts such as "Bread feeds the body but flowers the soul".

== Studies ==
Sandeman studied at the Glasgow School of Art, where her contemporaries included Joan Eardley and the poet Ian Hamilton Finlay. Sandeman was already a confident painter when she began art school and, like Eardley, one of a small group selected for special training by the head of drawing and painting, Hugh Adam Crawford. Both artists flourished under his experimental fast-track treatment. Crawford commented on "the inner structure [of Sandeman's paintings], which is not an optical thing."

== Relationship with Joan Eardley ==
Sandeman and Eardley met for the first time at Glasgow School of Art and became close friends.

"We were very shy of each other for about a year," Sandeman remembers. "But Joan's mother and my mother enticed us to do a Red Cross course together. We started having to bandage each other, that broke the ice! After that we became tremendously great friends."

Both lived in Bearsden and, although their styles were very different, they encouraged and supported each other, drew and painted together, and shared camping trips and family holidays. In 1941, as students, Sandeman and Eardley acquired a horse and caravan and travelled, sketched and painted around Loch Lomond. For many years, the two women regularly visited High Corrie on the Isle of Arran, renting an outhouse, "The Tabarnacle", as a studio.

In a review of a 1940s Society of Scottish Artists exhibition, a Scotsman art critic said,

"Miss Joan Eardley and Miss Margot Sandeman more than maintain the exciting promise of their first appearances […] Both are quite fearless and convinced exponents of highly individual outlooks."

== Work ==
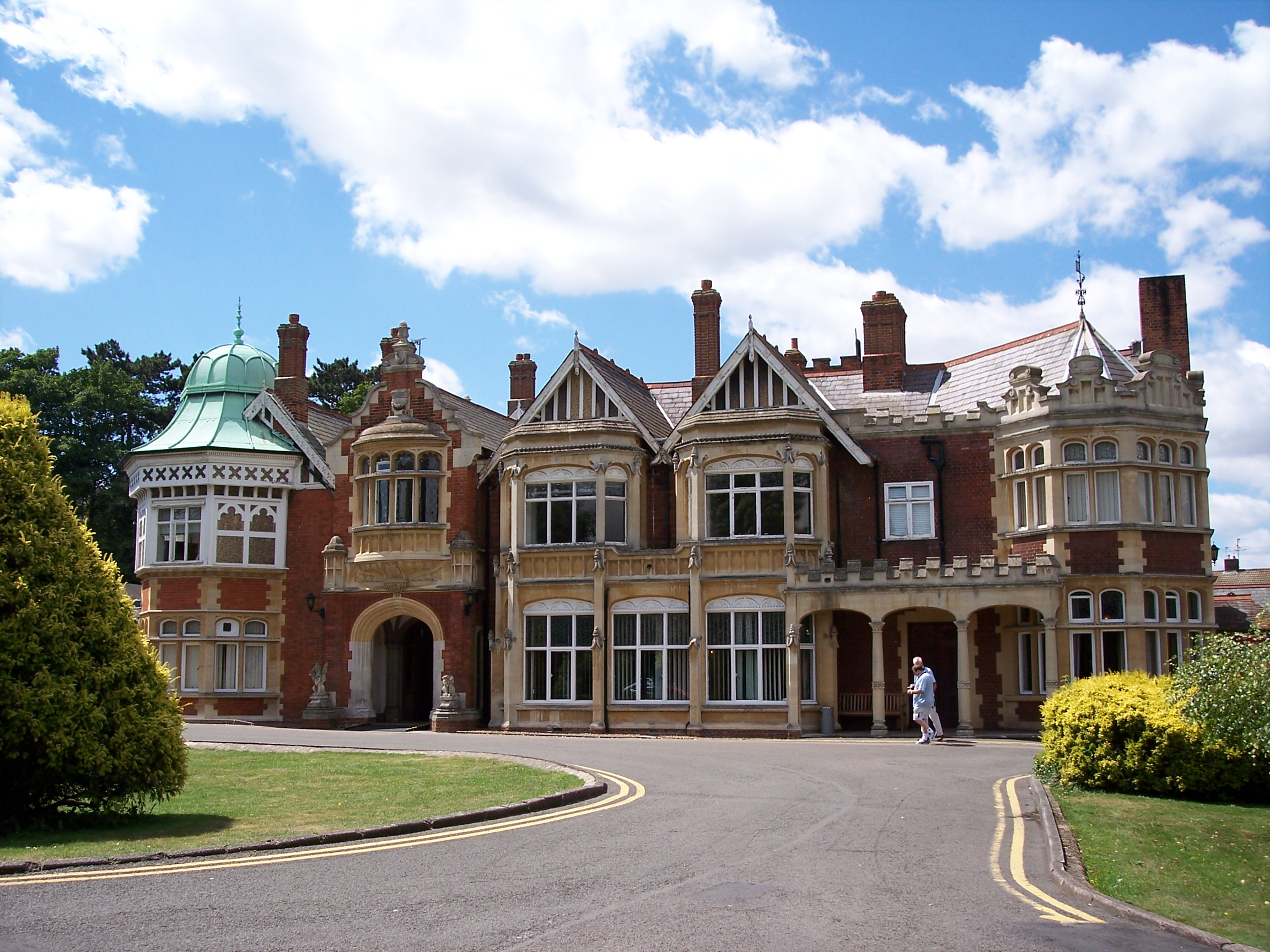
Bletchley Park, where Sandeman worked for a short time

Sandeman graduated from Glasgow School of Art during World War II and in 1942 was sent to Bletchley Park, where she worked for six months as a code-breaker.

After leaving Bletchley to care for her mother, Sandeman took a studio in Glasgow. Her first work there was a series of vivid still-lives while, for paid employment, she painted antique effects on lampshades.

In 1946 she married the teacher, potter and ceramic artist James Robson, with whom she had two sons.

Prolific and wide-ranging, Sandeman worked in the open air, in the studio, and from memory, creating unique interpretations of West Coast Scottish landscapes, rural settings, interiors and still lives. She collaborated regularly with poet Ian Hamilton Finlay.

In later life Sandeman's range and output continued to increase, including a notable suite of paintings in celebration of Scottish dramatist and poet Robert McLellan, a neighbour in High Corrie.

== Exhibitions and awards ==
Sandeman exhibited at The Royal Scottish Academy from 1946-1972, Cyril Gerber Fine Art, Compass Gallery, the Hughson Gallery, Glasgow, the Talbot Rice Gallery, Edinburgh, and the Lillie Art Gallery, Glasgow.

Her principal solo exhibitions were at the Richard Demarco Gallery, Edinburgh from 1974 onwards.

In 1964 Sandeman won the Guthrie Award of the Royal Scottish Academy and in 1970, the Redpath Award from the Society of Scottish Artists. She also received a Scottish Arts Council award in 1970. In 1989 she was Scottish winner in the Laing Competition.

== Collections ==
Sandeman's work is included in the permanent collection of the National Galleries of Scotland, University of Stirling, the Glasgow Life Museums, the Fleming Collection, among others.

== See also ==
- Art in modern Scotland
- Landscape painting in Scotland
