= Arthur Berry (playwright) =

English artist and writer (1925–1994)

Arthur Berry (7 February 1925 – 4 July 1994) was an English playwright, poet, teacher and artist, who was born in Smallthorne, Stoke-on-Trent. His individual creative work became deeply rooted in the culture, people and landscape of the industrial pottery town of Burslem.

== Life ==
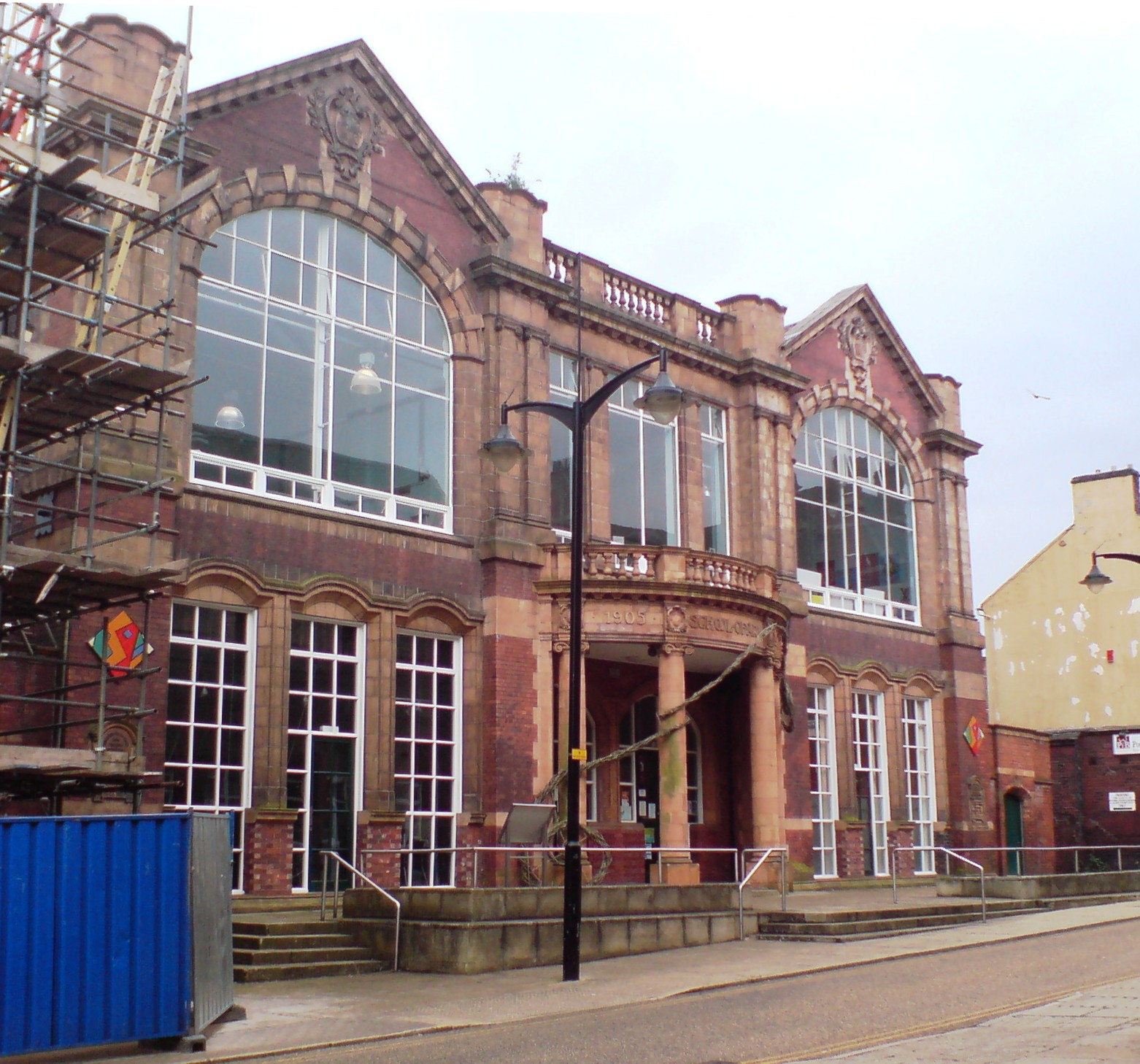
Burslem School of Art

Berry was the son of a publican and grew up in the potteries city of Stoke-on-Trent during the Depression. He was born with a crippled arm; as he could not work as a miner or manual labourer, Berry was enrolled at the Burslem School of Art in the city. Despite a rebellious start there, he came under the care of Gordon Mitchell Forsyth (1879–1952), director of art education and a successful pottery designer.

=== Studies at Royal College of Art ===
Berry gained a place at the Royal College of Art, as did a number of the more talented Burslem students. During his time at the Royal College the institution was evacuated from Kensington to Ambleside in the Lake District, to escape the German bombing of London during the Second World War.

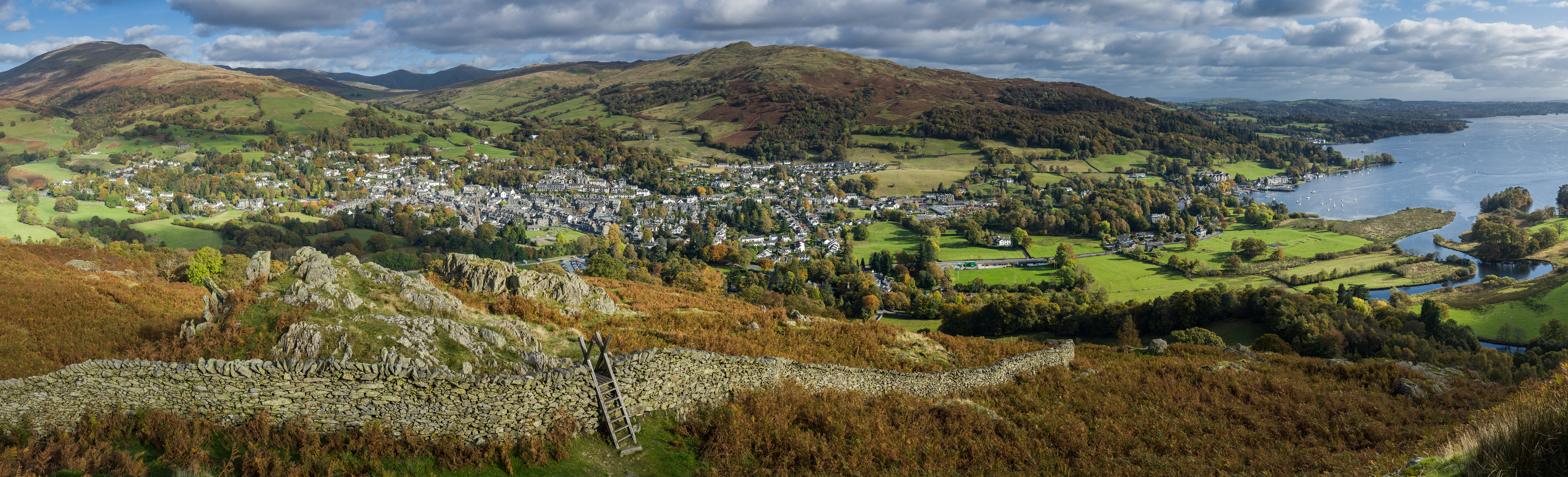
Ambleside, where Berry studied during the War

Berry, who suffered from agoraphobia, did not find the rural surroundings of Ambleside particularly to his taste. However, he appreciated the intense autumn colours which are characteristic of the locality. He spent the last year of the course in London.

=== Teaching career ===
After the war, Berry became an art teacher. He worked in London and Manchester, but as a teacher, he is best known for his long association with Burslem School of Art, where he had studied. Burslem School of Art was absorbed within Stoke-on-Trent College of Art, which in turn became part of North Staffordshire Polytechnic in 1971. Berry was a lecturer in painting at the Polytechnic until 1985. Berry's second wife, Cynthia, was one of his students. They married in 1966 and lived at Wolstanton, Newcastle-under-Lyme.

== Writing ==
Berry's first stage play was performed in 1976. His 1979 work Lament for the Lost Pubs of Burslem was awarded the Sony/Pye Award for the best radio monologue of 1979. It was also printed as a text in The Listener magazine (Christmas edition, 20–27 December 1979) and it starts with the lines:

"I sat down and wept when I remembered the lost pubs of Burslem, the demolished Star that stood where the Moonglow Ballroom stands now, on the corner of the street of the Preacher and the Tote office; it was a gaunt, dark building nicknamed the Star of Bethlehem, a grimey stuccoed star the colour of years of wet smoke. From outside it looked forbidding and empty, lit only by one or two naked electric light bulbs; its doors were difficult to find, its main door on the corner of the Square had been screwed down for some reason and on the inside covered with a piece of painted plywood. Only the side-doors would let you in and these were narrow and difficult to open. One was in Queen's Street and the other in William Clowes Street, opposite the Dolphin... for all its dreary appearance, the Star was the highest drinking temple in the town; nothing has been the same since it was knocked down. No pub has been more lamented."

Berry wrote an autobiography titled A Three and Sevenpence Halfpenny Man.

His other works include Dandelions (a volume of poems), and The Little Gold-Mine, a collection of stories about Potteries' life.

In 2018 a collection of unpublished poems by Arthur Berry were discovered in papers in the estate inside an envelope postdated 1972. All were typed and named. With the help of Barewall Art Gallery which works closely with the estate of Arthur Berry, a slim book of poetry by Arthur called On the Street was published.

== Berry's paintings ==
His paintings are held in numerous private and public collections. Berry has been referred to as 'the Lowry of the Potteries', being so described in the title of a 2007 exhibition of his work. The comparison was discussed in two related letters to The Sentinel:

Arthur Berry... was a good teacher and focus for art activity at the Burslem & Stoke Art School. I do not agree that he is for many the finest 20th century artist from Stoke - there are other candidates also. Mr Berry's work lies somewhere between painting and drawing - for me paint and its properties hold most attraction. Mr Berry's talent was spread over several areas - drawing, painting, writing, plays, poems and teaching. I do not think I am good enough myself to do several things well, so concentrate on one (painting). Mr Berry said he admired Lowry and once encountered him in a Manchester Gallery - said he was built and made for a particular task - as an artist recording the vanishing industrial scene of Manchester....Mr Berry was, I feel, a humorist whose interest was the people of the old working class of Stoke - a type of person who no longer exists. I mostly liked his landscapes. They seemed to convey that strange Stoke light which appeals to me and the old buildings and streets which were very much part of my own childhood and youth.

The Arthur Berry exhibition of work at Ford Green Hall...is compact but conveys the flavour of what the local writer and poet was all about. There is an earthiness and a vitality about much of his work and though abstract painting is not everyone's cup of tea, there is a power about Berry's that is probably best conveyed if you look at the pieces collectively. The Sentinel's article called him the Lowry of the Potteries, though in my opinion, the paintings of Biddulph Moor-born C W Brown, sometimes known as "The Potteries' Primitive", stand comparison. Berry was a fan of Brown, incidentally.

From July 2015 to January 2016 a major show titled Lowry and Berry: Observers of Urban Life, displaying works dating from the 1960s to 1994, was held at the Potteries Museum and Art Gallery in Stoke-on-Trent.

From October 16 2025 to January 19 2026 there was an exhibition at Keele University called "Canals, Kilns and Characters" featuring the work of Arthur Berry and, fellow Burslem resident, Maurice Wade.

== Stoke-on-Trent life ==
Berry recalls the artistic inspiration he obtained from... "the streets of my early childhood, the moorland landscape, pit villages, public houses, chip shops, night town and later avenue life." Lamenting change, he bemoans that, "the old wooden mangle rollers were replaced by rubber wringers, the iron range grate by little fancy tiled affairs, the elegant, slim paper packets of five Woodbines disappeared..." He felt he had been born into a tightly cohesive society, but "the values that had held the working class together began to slowly be eroded." He loved a world that was filled with, "a line of shunted coal waggons...wreaths of steam and a smell of gas...youths playing cards at the back of the old knackers yard...old men cough in the betting shops and huge fat women queue in the Co-op...the chain row and pit-head gear." This was a "place of empty chapels and aborted kilns", "the window cleaner with wild eyes and a mania for gambling", or indeed "an effeminate man who wears a ginger wig...muttering to himself all day, he pushes an old pram with a bird cage in it." Touchingly, he noticed the habits of the people: "at weekends when you are flush and filled with drink or the prospect of drink", and when one might feel "as dry as a lime-burner's clog." He loved "the sunken bricks of his garden path." and even a visit to the gents could become an inspiring revelation: "as I stand piddling in the crazed urinal stall I can see the red and green tail lights of some night plane moving across this area of infinite velvet over the darkened hoop of the world."

Berry's love of north Staffordshire was deep and permanent; he indulged in an incurable addiction to the place. He "had an inexplicable attraction to the place and...was attached to the area by "an invisible umbilical cord", which could never be cut." He said of his childhood "every house seemed to have an old woman, a drunken man, a gang of kids and a snarling dog." Certainly then he was, "a thinker of the working class who developed a love of middle class pursuits." He said he had "always worked out of one world, the working class world of which I am part", while declaring, "I am a man of habit and pattern." He "became a cult figure following many television appearances in the Midlands." His attachment to the place was a legend. For example, "when he obtained work as a teacher in Chelsea College of Art he commuted every day and night from Biddulph Moor." And indeed "propping up the bar at his local public house...is where he felt most comfortable." Yet it was during the 1950s that the, "crushing black agoraphobia descended on him, virtually imprisoning him in North Staffordshire for the rest of his life." But as a man, poet, playwright and artist he came into his own. Peter Cheeseman (Director, for thirty-five years, of the Victoria Theatre, Stoke-on-Trent and, latterly, the New Victoria Theatre, Newcastle-under-Lyme), recalls the many animated conversations they had enjoyed, and "the swift gestures of his good left arm, banging at the elbow of his useless right...and the rich talk that pours out of him." He was "eloquent in every way...a vigorous and expressive poet...a writer of stories, a dramatist...grotesquely hilarious...[and] an inspiring teacher of art, loved and admired by his students." He was "a large, ungainly and glum man, tall and remote, cloth cap sitting permanently over his expressionless face." He seemed to have something of a love-hate relationship with his art, for "he once sent a groaning van-load off to Stoke tip: a great weight lifted off me." He was really "a painter and poet of the cluttered and dying landscape of pits and ironworks...he writes of that world with unexpected imagery and a great roaring sense of humour, sometimes wry, often grotesque." As a painter, he strained "to paint a world he loved passionately for its vigour and its energy and its richness before the bulldozer scraped it away." He felt his paintings to be "the most eloquent utterances, portraits of a world seen from the bottom of my rut." This was indeed "a world filled with images of people and landscape that have been twisted and worn into strange shapes by hard work and poverty. My Parthenon is an allotment hut knocked together out of bits of rubbish. It is the richness of poor things that I am drawn to." As he told Peter Cheeseman, "everything I have ever drawn, every house, every man, every face has its roots in those few streets [of Smallthorne] All the things I have written, or hope to write, I am sure will have the same roots."

The observations Berry made of working people are perhaps the most enduring: "old women, who sat night after night, squat as frogs, drinking, watching, eating and taking all in", "and the publican had got a clean collar and tie on, and all the world was ship-shape--this was happiness." "I once saw a pot-woman dance an impromptu fertility dance...the woman sitting with him had knees the size of hams, and drank a case of bottled beer as she sat there." And "then there are the princes of drink, men high in the hierarchy of booze, popes of the tap-room...they manage to live and live with style; to smoke and drink and back horses without ever seeming to concern themselves about money...savour the full richness of the working class who can live without work...I have known such men rear big families on the dole, and strut up the street with a rose in their buttonhole." Then there are the "ordinary men who cannot make ends meet and are under the rule of women...lesser men, who are pestered by women and children, whooping cough and rashes of one sort or another...troubles that reduce an honest man to a worrying machine...all the bellyaching and mither and half-pint scrimping that bogs most men down...the poverty, and the poverty of just being able to make ends meet...[for it is] bosses and women and children [who] pull men down from their dignity."

== People and places of Berry's world ==
In Berry's autobiography A Three and Sevenpence Halfpenny Man he wrote of his childhood and of his daily life at Burslem School of Art. He tells of going down to London and meeting "the two Roberts", Robert MacBryde and Robert Colquhoun, of perusing pictures in the galleries of the capital and of boozing his way through his student life there at the Royal College of Art in Chelsea. He tells of life in Stoke as well as his trips abroad, first with his wife and then in his later years when he travelled on his own little Grand Tour through Italy and France and into Spain. His book of short stories, The Little Gold Mine depicts the people of North Staffordshire and their lives in the 1950s and 60s and includes pencil sketches of those same people.

Berry describes many people and places in his poems and stories. These include "a dirty-faced child", [Dandelions, 39] a "chinless creature with slack stockings", [39] and "a baby with a big head and a chalk-white face who didn't look as though it was for this world long". [39] All "her ever thinks about is her belly, she would eat a raw monkey if there was any chance." [41] In a long poem, he describes lots of people one might encounter in a dole office: "the wives of unemployed window cleaners, threadbare dandies, part-time tatooists, ex-bin men with double ruptures, alcoholic chefs, addleheads, pinheads, honest clerks, and loud-mouthed shitheads, with hanging trouser arses, flyboys and water-headed idiots led by their mothers, and reasonable men, genuine victims with polished shoes." [44] Also a man who helps poor people make claims: "a master of claims and benefits, a poor man's lawyer in fact", [57] helping "a poverty-stricken illiterate", [57] and "men who have put their hopes on horses - men that have lived beyond their women, and those who were always too ill-shaped to love, and so loved drink...and laughing men, who have boozed their dead wives club money, and those that sleep late and stand waiting for opening time", [58] for "drinking men often die lonely deaths, those who have forsaken women and have died in their camaraderie of booze." [64] As opposed to those "dutiful husbands who have faced up to their responsibilities and not drunk every penny they could get their hands on." [64] He describes "an old man in a gate hole spits into the cobbled backs and watches a young woman with a fat behind, pinning washing out, in a pair of slacks." [65] He describes a pub regular called Bernard who "has a small stomach and has difficulty in polishing off a bag of crisps at one go", [67] Love, Berry suggests, "is also often held in silence and sometimes you don't know it's been there till it's gone". [86]

His advice about art can be summarised thus: "in painting pictures, accidents can often be fortuitous". [55]

== Legacy ==
In the early years of the 2000s there was an annual Arthur Berry Fellowship award for young artists, administered on behalf of his widow Cynthia Berry.

A year-long programme of events to mark the centenary of Berry's birth is underway in Stoke-on-Trent and Newcastle-under-Lyme throughout 2025, supported by the National Lottery Heritage Fund. Events include exhibitions at The New Vic Theatre, Potteries Museum & Art Gallery, film screenings, talks, art, poetry and theatre workshops, school events, the reissue of his poem collection "Dandelions", new publication of a children's book adapted from one of his recorded monologues, "The Tin Chapel", release of an "Arthur Berry Colouring Gallery", the release of an animation, "A Bunch of Flowers", which combines his paintings and an audio story, and the production of his play "Whatever Happened to Phoebe Salt", opening May 2025: arthurberry100.co.uk.

== Bibliography of Berry's works ==
=== Plays ===
Mainly performed at the Victoria Theatre, Stoke-on-Trent. In 1986 the New Vic Theatre, Newcastle-under-Lyme, opened and premiered "St George of Scotia Road".

- Olive Goes to Town, a comedy in one act for women [with Deane Baker], 1958
- The Spanish Dancer from Pinnox Street, 1976
- Wizards All [co-author], 1977
- Dr Fergo's Last Passion, 1979
- Quiet please, 1981
- Dr Fergo Rides Again, 1982
- The Sweet Bird of Card Street, 1984
- St George of Scotia Road, 1986
- Miss Cardell's School Days, nd
- The Dance of Aberkariu's, nd
- Whatever Happened to Phoebe Salt, opens May 2025

=== Audio ===
Recordings of Berry's monologues were made privately between Arthur Berry and Arthur Wood in Arthur Berry's home. Copyright remains with the estate of Arthur Berry and the estate of Arthur Wood.

Some of the recordings were broadcast on BBC Radio Stoke, across the BBC local radio network, and some items were featured on Radio 4's "Pick of The Week". Arthur Wood accepted a PYE radio award for Best Scripted Radio Talk in 1979 for Berry's monologue "Lament for the Lost Pubs of Burslem".

Berry privately released a collection of eight of his monologues on audio-cassette in 1980, entitled "Lullaby of Queen Street". The album was re-released on CD to coincide with the Lowry and Berry exhibition in July 2015.

Track listing for "Lullaby of Queen Street":

- Homage to the Chip
- Lament for the Lost Pubs of Burslem
- Sweet Mystery of life
- In Praise of Backs
- Just a Steady Six
- Happy Family
- Homage to the Oatcake
- The Meatmarket

A further audio collection, "Some Cinders, Some Dockweed" (2019), was released posthumously on CD by Barewall.

Track listing for "Some Cinders, Some Dockweed":

- Once Upon a Sunday Afternoon
- The Tin Chapel
- The Fever Van
- Bodge
- Hot Ears (Bodies in Motion)
- Wasteground
- A Visit to Cornelius
- The Lesson

=== For television ===
- Half a Smile from Stoke BBC Omnibus production
- A Three and Sevenpence Halfpenny Man Central TV Contact Series
- Arthur Berry of Hanley ATV 1978

=== Others ===
- Street Corner Ballads ~Arthur Berry, Ironmarket, Paperback, 30 July 1977
- A Three and Sevenpence Halfpenny Man, Kermase Editions, Paperback, 1984 ISBN 1-870124-00-6
- The Little Gold-Mine, stories, 1991
- Dandelions, poems, 1993, reissued, Barewall Books, 2025
- Arthur Berry: An Observer of Urban Life, Art Catalogue 2015
- On The Street: Poems by Arthur Berry Barewall Books, Paperback, 2018
- The Tin Chapel and Other Bits of Daft, by Arthur Berry, Barewall Books, Hardback, 2025
- An Arthur Berry Colouring Gallery, Barewall Books, Paperback, 2025

== Retrospectives ==
- Arthur Berry retrospective exhibition: Stoke-on-Trent City Museum and Art Gallery, 17 September-27 October 1984, catalogue, Stoke-on-Trent City Museum and Art Gallery (1984).
- Arthur Berry. The Gallery, Manchester, 1995.
- Arthur Berry: twenty-five paintings, School of Art, Burslem, Stoke-on-Trent, 29 April - 20 May 2005.
- Arthur Berry – the Lowry of the Potteries, Ford Green Hall, Smallthorne, Stoke-on-Trent, 2007:

"Local artist, poet and writer Arthur Berry had strong links with Smallthorne and this small display focuses on his paintings, writing and unique sense of humour. It includes a video with footage of the artist speaking about his work".

- Arthur Berry poetry recital, Ford Green Hall 29 April 2007.
- Arthur Berry: private, School of Art, Burslem, Stoke-on-Trent, 16 July 2010 – 24 August 2010.
- The Boys, Keele University, Staffordshire; May 2012. Exhibition alongside work of Jack Simcock and Enos Lovatt.
- The Burslem Boys, Barewall Art Gallery, Burslem, Stoke-on-Trent, 19 October 2012 – 3 November 2012; exhibited alongside work of fellow Burslem School of Art students John Shelton and Norman Cope.
- Lowry and Berry - Observers of Urban Life, the Potteries Museum & Art Gallery, City Centre, Stoke-on-Trent, 25 July 2015 – 10 January 2016; a major exhibition where Arthur Berry is exhibited for the first time alongside the work of L. S. Lowry.
- Unseen Works from The Estate of Arthur Berry, The Foxlowe Arts Centre, Leek, Staffordshire Moorlands, 1 October 2016 – 12 November 2016.
- Arthur Berry's Old Timers, Barewall Art Gallery, Burslem, Stoke-on-Trent, 21 Jul 2018 - 16 Sept 2018.
- BERRY RAW, at New Vic Theatre, Newcastle-under-Lyme, curated by Barewall Art Gallery, 30 January - 1 March 2025.
- Theatre Maker, at New Vic Theatre, Newcastle-under-Lyme, curated by Vic Theatre Archive and Barewall Art Gallery, 7 May - 28 June 2025.
