= James Boswell (artist) =

New Zealand painter, draughtsman (1906–1971)

James Edward Buchanan Boswell (9 June 1906 – 15 April 1971) was a New Zealand-born British painter, draughtsman and socialist.

== Life ==
James Boswell was born in New Zealand on 9 June 1906, at Westport, South Island, the son of a Scottish born schoolmaster, Edward Blair Buchanan Boswell, and his New Zealand born wife Ida Fair. He was educated at Auckland Grammar School, Auckland and the Elam School of Art before coming to London in 1925 to continue his training at the Royal College of Art until 1929. Although he was dismissed twice from the RCA painting school over conflicts with its then anti-modern stance, his early works were accepted by the London Group, with whom he exhibited from 1927 to 1932.

He joined the Communist Party in 1932, switching from oil painting to illustration and establishing himself as a left-wing artist in the 1930s. He was a co-founder of the Marxist and anti-Fascist pressure group, the Artists' International (later called Artists' International Association, often referred to as the AIA), and contributed Hogarthian satirical prints to the Left Review, for which he was art editor, and, as "Buchan", cartoons for the Daily Worker.

Around 1933 he married the artist, Elizabeth (Betty) Soars.

In 1936 he joined the publicity department of the Asiatic Petroleum Company (part of the Shell corporation) though continuing his socialist and anti-war involvement, such as exhibiting with the AIA during the Spanish Civil War.

During World War II, Boswell was called up in 1941, initially training in Scotland as a radiographer in the British Royal Army Medical Corps. Although in contact with War Artists' Advisory Committee, which bought some of his work, he was not officially commissioned, because of his Communist Party membership. From 1942–1943 he served in Iraq, rising to the rank of major.

After the war, Boswell returned briefly to Shell, leaving in 1947.

He subsequently worked as art editor of Lilliput magazine until 1950; wrote a book on art in society, The Artist's Dilemma; worked with Basil Spence as a mural painter for the 1951 Festival of Britain; designed film posters for Ealing Studios; and edited the house journal of Sainsbury's until 1971. He also designed the Labour Party campaign for the successful 1964 general election.

He separated from his wife in 1966, and thereafter lived with Ruth Abel, who in 1967 changed her name to Boswell by deed poll.

Boswell died of cancer in London on 15 April 1971.

In 2006 Tate Britain held a centenary display of his work, and The British Museum an exhibition of war drawings in their archives. In that year, Muswell Press published his war drawings from London, Scotland and Iraq: 'James Boswell: Unofficial War Artist', with text by William Feaver.

His great-grandson James Boswell is also an illustrator and is occasionally confused with him.

== Works ==
He made many drawings of life in Britain during the 1930s and sketches of life in war-time Britain.

His pre-war satirical style has been described as "attractively pugnacious" and compared to the work of the German artists George Grosz and Otto Dix and to British artist/illustrators such as Edward Ardizzone. It was an influence on later artists such as Ronald Searle and Paul Hogarth. Although much of his work was political satire aimed at exposing class injustice, he also produced work simply portraying everyday life, such as his 1939 series of London lithographs.

Despite not being an official British war artist, he is known for his depictions of life in the armed services, including his service in Iraq. These, now in the Tate, The British Museum and Imperial War Museum in London, evoke the atmosphere, boredom and solitude of military life. While in Iraq he also produced a series of fierce surreal sketches graphically illustrating his view of war more symbolically:

"a bestial farce conducted by bulls. These Orwellian animals, often dressed in generals' uniforms, heave their obese bulk through page after page. They ride on the backs of exhausted Tommies, pause with a watering-can to sprinkle a flower-pot containing the grotesquely dismembered skeleton of a soldier and sit on a hideous pile of corpses and ruined buildings while they type out a mass of documents which sail ridiculously into the sky. Sometimes they play at doctors and press a telescope to their ears in order to inspect a truncated, headless body held up with callous unconcern by two horned orderlies. And then they turn into bespectacled priests who ram a huge graveyard cross into a hapless soldier's mouth. The flow of imagery is as prodigal as it is remorseless, suggesting that Boswell treated these sketchbooks as a cathartic outlet for all his deepest loathing of war"

In later life Boswell settled into painting abstract oils and landscapes. Boswell also drew illustrations in Lilliput for Maurice Richardson's series The Exploits of Engelbrecht; some of these were later reprinted when the series was reprinted in book form.
