= Killearn Hospital =

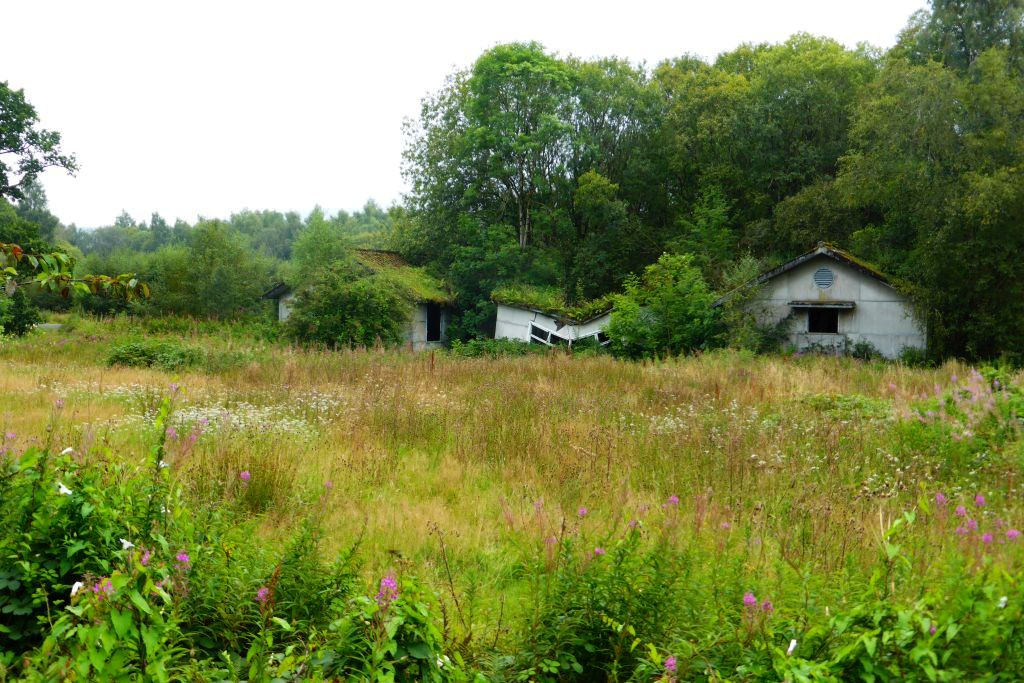
- Killearn Hospital (in ruin)

- Location of the hospital in the Stirling council area

Geography
- Location: Killearn, Stirling, Scotland
- Coordinates: 56.0345°N 4.3963°W

Organisation
- Care system: NHS
- Type: General hospital

History
- Founded: 1940
- Closed: 1972

Links
- Lists: Hospitals in Scotland

Killearn Hospital was a health facility at Killearn in the Stirling council area of Scotland.

== History ==
The hospital was established as one of seven Emergency Hospital Service facilities for military casualties in 1940. It received casualties during the Clydebank Blitz when two devastating Luftwaffe air raids on the shipbuilding and munition-making town of Clydebank in Scotland took place in March 1941. The wooden huts which had been erected during the war continued to be used for civilian purposes after the war. It joined the National Health Service in 1948 but, because of its remote location, it eventually closed in 1972.
