= Paul Hogarth =

English painter

Paul Hogarth, OBE, RA (born Arthur Hoggarth) (4 October 1917 – 27 December 2001) was an English artist and illustrator. He is best known for the cover drawings that he prepared in the 1980s for the Penguin edition of Graham Greene's books. In his usual, witty and well-mannered way, Paul enjoyed claiming to have a distant connection with William Hogarth, whose father was also born Hoggarth.

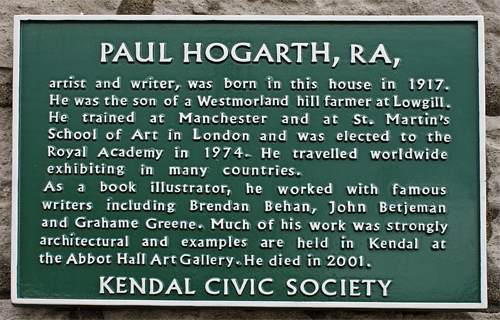

== Biography ==
Paul Hogarth was born at 28 Caroline Street in Kendal, Westmorland, and aged 6 moved in 1923 with his family to Manchester. His father was also named Arthur Hoggarth. He attended the Manchester School of Art from 1934 to 1936, where he became involved in the Artists' International Association and the Communist Party of Great Britain. After 1936 he attended Saint Martin's School of Art in London, and drove lorries in the Spanish Civil War for the International Brigade.

Paul Hogarth was a painter with a talent for illustration and reportage, which was allied to his love of travel. This led him to produce drawings and watercolours recording events and places all over the world. As an illustrator he studied under James Boswell, and worked with a number of eminent authors, including Robert Graves, Graham Greene, Brendan Behan, Lawrence Durrell, and William Golding. He illustrated the New Penguin Shakespeare series of paperbacks in the 1970s, and his work can also be seen on the cover of John Wyndham's The Midwich Cuckoos (1964, Penguin ).

He was elected an associate member of the Royal Academy in 1974, a full member in 1984; and was awarded the OBE in 1989. His work is held in collections worldwide, and he exhibited regularly in the Francis Kyle Gallery in London. Hogarth died on 27 December 2001(age 84), full name Arthur Paul Hoggarth, having added the second name by which he is better known. At the time of his death he had been married to actress Diana Hogarth (stage name Diana Robson) for 12 years.
