= Reginald George Haggar =

British ceramic designer (1905–1988)

Reginald George Haggar (1905–1988), R.I., A.R.C.A., F.R.S.A., was a British ceramic designer, born in Ipswich. Aged 12 he became a delivery boy for a florist’s, then studied at the Ipswich School of Art from 1922–1926, followed by the Royal College of Art, to which he won a Royal Exhibition and where he was taught by Reco Capey. In 1929, he became an assistant designer at Mintons Pottery in Stoke-on-Trent, rising to art director six months later, a post he held until 1939. Working in watercolors and ceramics, his designs reflected both the radical and lyrical elements of the Art Deco style.

After leaving Mintons, he became master-in-charge of the Stoke School of Art in 1941 and then of the Burslem School of Art until 1945.

Thereafter, he was a freelance artist, writer and lecturer. From the mid-1940s, for over 30 years, Haggar was president of the Society of Staffordshire Artists. He painted many pictures of the North Staffordshire area. Several museums and galleries hold artworks by Haggar in their collection, including The Potteries Museum & Art Gallery, Keele University, Brampton Museum and the Victoria and Albert Museum.

The Reginald Haggar Memorial Lecture Fund was established after his death, which continues to run a programme of annual lectures and symposia as testament to Haggar's great influence as a teacher, lecturer and educator in the widest sense, in addition to his work as an artist, designer and author. Previous speakers at the annual Reginald Haggar Memorial Lecture include Dame Margaret Drabble, Cornelia Parker, Simon Thurley, Tristram Hunt and Professor Neil Brownsword.

The Memorial Lecture in 2020, which was held online, was on the subject of 'Reginald Haggar: The Man and his Work', with presentations and a panel discussion which included Peter Vigurs, Deborah Skinner, Pat Halfpenny, Geoff Halfpenny and Dr Chris Wakeling, along with film clips of Haggar supplied by Staffordshire Film Archive.

== Publications ==
- Recent ceramic sculpture in Great Britain, J. Tiranti ltd, 1946
- English Pottery Figures, 1660-1860, J. Tiranti (printed by Barnard & Westwood), 1947
- A new guide to old pottery: English country pottery, M. M. McBride, 1950
- English Country Pottery, Phoenix House, 1950
- The Masons of Lane Delph and the origin of Masons patent ironstone, Printed for G.L. Ashworth & Bros. by P.L. Humphries, 1952
- Staffordshire chimney ornaments, Phoenix House, 1955
- Pottery Through the Ages, Roy Publishers, 1959
- Sculpture through the ages, London: Methuen, 1960
- Glass and glassmakers, London: Methuen, 1961
- A dictionary of art terms: painting, sculpture, architecture, Oldbourne Press, 1962
- The Concise Encyclopedia of Continental Pottery and Porcelain, Praeger, 1968
- with Elizabeth Adams, Mason porcelain and ironstone 1796-1853, Miles Mason and the Mason Manufactories, London: Faber, 1977

== See also ==
- Susie Cooper
- Gordon Forsyth
- Burslem School of Art
