= Robert MacBryde =

Scottish artist

Table with Fruit, 1948.

Robert MacBryde (5 December 1913 – 6 May 1966) was a Scottish still-life and figure painter and a theatre set designer.

== Early life and career ==
MacBryde was born in Maybole, Ayrshire, to John MacBryde, a cement labourer, and Agnes Kennedy MacBryde. He worked in a factory for five years after leaving school before studying art at Glasgow School of Art from 1932 to 1937. There, he met Robert Colquhoun, with whom he established a lifelong romantic relationship and professional collaboration, the pair becoming known as "the two Roberts". MacBryde studied and travelled in France and Italy, assisted by scholarships, returning to London in 1939. He shared studio space with Colquhoun, and the pair shared a house with John Minton and, from 1943, Jankel Adler. MacBryde held his first one-person exhibition at the Lefevre Gallery in 1943.

== Rise, decline and influences ==
At the height of their acclaim, MacBryde and Colquhoun maintained a wide circle of friends and associates, including painters Michael Ayrton, Francis Bacon, Lucian Freud and John Minton as well as the writers Fred Urquhart, George Barker, Elizabeth Smart, Frank Norman and Dylan Thomas.

Influenced by Graham Sutherland and John Piper, MacBryde became a well-known painter of the Modernist school of art, known for his brightly coloured Cubist studies. His later work evolved into a darker, Expressionist range of still lifes and landscapes. In collaboration with Colquhoun, he created several set designs during and after the Second World War. These included sets for Gielgud's Macbeth, King Lear at Stratford and Massine's Scottish ballet Donald of the Burthens, produced by the Sadler's Wells Ballet at Covent Garden in 1951. During the 1950s, both MacBryde and Colquhoun lost the attention of the art scene due to the rise of Abstraction, and as both had become heavy drinkers, serious artistic work became almost impossible. Since neither had any private means, they were reduced at times to near destitution. During this period they had a studio in the village of Groton in Suffolk.

== Last years and death ==
Colquhoun died suddenly in London in 1962. Soon afterwards MacBryde moved to Ireland, where for a time he shared a house with Patrick Kavanagh, with whom he had become friendly in London. However, he was still drinking heavily and seems to have made no serious effort to paint again. The Times stated that MacBryde had disappeared into obscurity after Colquhoun's death.

Robert MacBryde died in 1966 in Dublin as a result of a street accident. Anthony Cronin, a friend of MacBryde and Colquhoun, describes them both with affection and respect in his memoir Dead as Doornails, as does the English painter, playwright and poet Arthur Berry in his autobiography A Three And Sevenpence Half Penny Man.
