= Robert Colquhoun =

Scottish artist

- Woman with a Young Goat, 1948
- Born: 20 December 1914; Kilmarnock, Scotland
- Died: 20 September 1962 (aged 47); London, England, UK

Robert Colquhoun (20 December 1914 – 20 September 1962) was a Scottish painter, printmaker and theatre set designer.

== Early life and education ==
Colquhoun was born in Kilmarnock and was educated at Kilmarnock Academy. He won a scholarship to study at the Glasgow School of Art, where he met Robert MacBryde with whom he established a lifelong romantic relationship and professional collaboration, the pair becoming known as "the two Roberts". Both studied with James Cowie at Hospitalfield House in Arbroath.

== Career ==
In the summer of 1938 Colquhoun and MacBryde set off on a travelling scholarship to France and Italy. Whilst in Paris they met up with their friend from Arbroath, the Irish realist painter Patrick Hennessy also on a similar scholorship. The three travelling south together that autumn slowly by train to Marseille and some months later to Genoa and Rome.

Colquhoun served as an ambulance driver in the Royal Army Medical Corps during the Second World War. After being injured, he returned to London in 1941 where he shared studio space with MacBryde. The pair shared a house with John Minton and, from 1943, Jankel Adler.

Colquhoun's early works of agricultural labourers and workmen were strongly influenced by the colours and light of rural Ayrshire. His work developed into a more austere, Expressionist style, heavily influenced by Picasso, and concentrated on the theme of the isolated, agonised figure. From the mid-1940s to the early 1950s he was considered one of the leading artists of his generation. Along with that of MacBryde, the work of Colquhoun was regularly shown at the Lefevre Gallery in London.

At the height of their acclaim they courted a large circle of friends – including Michael Ayrton, Francis Bacon, Lucian Freud and John Minton as well as the writers Fred Urquhart, George Barker, Elizabeth Smart and Dylan Thomas – and were known for their parties at their studio (77 Bedford Gardens). Colquhoun was also a printmaker, producing a large number of lithographs and monotypes throughout his career.

During and after the Second World War he worked with MacBryde on several set designs. These included sets for Gielgud's Macbeth, King Lear at Stratford and Massine's Scottish ballet Donald of the Burthens, produced by the Sadler's Wells Ballet at Covent Garden in 1951. During the 1950s their artistic reputation went into serious decline, and their heavy drinking made any serious effort to paint impossible. According to their friend Anthony Cronin they were often close to destitution. During this period they had a studio in the village of Groton in Suffolk.

In May 1958, his work was shown in a solo exhibition at the Whitechapel Gallery in London, England.

Robert Colquhoun died, an alcoholic, in relative obscurity in London in 1962. MacBryde moved to Dublin, where he was killed in a traffic accident in 1966. Their friend Anthony Cronin describes them with respect and affection in his memoir Dead as Doornails.

== Legacy ==
A retrospective exhibition Robert MacBryde and Robert Colquhoun: Artists, Lovers, Outsiders, previously shown at Charleston Farmhouse, runs until January 2027, showing some recently rediscovered works by the two artists. A still life was identified on The Antiques Roadshow in 2026, a gift from Colquhoun to a vicar as a token of thanks for his negotiation which lifted their ban from a local pub following poor behaviour.

== Works ==
- Mysterious Figures (1960)
- Woman with Leaping Cat (1945)

== External links and further reading ==
- 50 artworks by or after Robert Colquhoun at the Art UK site
- Bristow, Roger (2009). The Last Bohemians: The Two Roberts – Colquhoun and MacBryde. Bristol, UK: Sansom & Co. ISBN 978-1906593193.
- Brown, Andrew (1981), Spiritual and Temporal Hazards: The Art of Robert Colquhoun, in Murray, Glen (ed.) Cencrastus No. 6, Autumn 1981, pp. 14–17
- Elliot, Patrick (2017), Robert Colquhoun 1914–1962 in Strang, Alice (ed.) (2017), A New Era: Scottish Modern Art 1900 - 1950, National Galleries of Scotland, pp. 38 & 39, ISBN 978-1911054-16-0
- Biography at the Tate Gallery
- Robert Colquhoun on the Gazetteer for Scotland
- The Roberts at the Scottish National Gallery (exhibition catalogue)
