= Victor Skellern =

British ceramics designer (1909–1966)

Victor G. Skellern (1909–1966) was a British ceramics designer and stained glass producer who was the art director at Wedgwood from 1934 to 1965. He helped to modernise Wedgwood, and his design work was a factor in the company's resurgence after 1935. He was also known for employing well-known designers from outside the company. Skellern's ceramics designs were exhibited at Grafton Galleries (1936) and the Britain Can Make It exhibition (1946) in London. Some of his designs are now on display at the V&A Museum, Yale Center for British Art, Museum of Applied Arts & Sciences and the Wedgwood Museum. His design "Strawberry Hill", with Millicent Taplin, was awarded the Council of Industrial Design's Design of the Year Award in 1957.

== Biography ==
Skellern was born in 1909, in Fenton, Stoke-on-Trent in Staffordshire. From 1923, he worked in design for Wedgwood at the Etruria Works, under the supervision of John Goodwin, while studying art at the Burslem and Hanley Schools of Art, where he was tutored by Gordon Forsyth and Percy Lloyd. His earliest design for the company is documented in 1929. He then studied stained glass with Edward Bawden at the Royal College of Art (1930–34). Information on his stained glass is limited; he painted the "Potland" panel in 1933, once in the Stoke-on-Trent Museum, and exhibited a stained-glass window in 1936.

In 1934, he rejoined Wedgwood as the company's art director, replacing Goodwin on his retirement, becoming the first person to hold the post with a formal education in design. He remained in the position for the rest of his career, at first at the Etruria site and from 1940 at the new Barlaston factory. He is credited with helping to modernise Wedgwood. This included collaborating with Wedgwood's production director Norman Wilson to develop novel glazes, as well as developing high-quality transfer printed patterns and advocating for their wider use. His design work has been cited as one of the reasons for the company's resurgence after 1935. He also developed Wedgwood's use of well-known designers from outside the company, including Keith Murray, (Note: Murray was first employed by Wedgwood as a freelance designer in 1933, but Skellern continued the association until 1936, when Murray started to plan the company's new factory at Barlaston.) Bawden, Eric Ravilious, Rex Whistler and Laurence Whistler.

He was an associate of the Royal College of Art and a fellow of the Society of Industrial Artists. Skellern retired in 1965, and died the following year.

== Ceramics designs ==
In the 1930s, Skellern created Art Deco ware including "Persian Ponies", "Forest Folk" and "Seasons", in collaboration with other in-house designers such as Millicent Taplin. His early work features in Forsyth's 1936 book, 20th Century Ceramics. His 1930s tableware designs were reasonably inexpensive and targeted at relatively young purchasers with "some taste but no money". He remained in charge of the design department through the Second World War, designing "Victory Ware", a utilitarian range in earthenware described as "highly practical" and "austere". His notable post-war designs include "Strawberry Hill" (around 1957), with Taplin, a particularly popular design for printed and gilded bone china, which received one of the earliest Council of Industrial Design's Design of the Year Award in 1957.

Cheryl Buckley describes the work of Skellern and other male Wedgwood designers of the period, including Murray, Ravilious and Wilson, as "simple, relatively unadorned, and rectilinear"; though she characterises it as more Modernist than that of women designers including Taplin, Star Wedgwood and Daisy Makeig-Jones, she also notes that Skellern's designs reflect traditional as well as modern influences. Diane Taylor considers the works of Skellern, Taplin and Star Wedgwood, another Wedgwood in-house designer, to present a "coherent stylistic approach... based upon simplicity and restraint".

Skellern's designs were exhibited at Grafton Galleries in London in 1936, and at the Council of Industrial Design's Britain Can Make It exhibition in London in 1946. Several of his designs are preserved in the permanent ceramics collection of the V&A Museum, including "Forest Folk" (1934), "Persian Pony" (1939), "Asia" (1956), "Lincoln" (1956), "Strawberry Hill" (1957), and "Avocado" (1959). Examples of his designs are also preserved at the Yale Center for British Art in New Haven, Connecticut, the Museum of Applied Arts & Sciences in Sydney, and the Wedgwood Museum, Barlaston.
