= University of Staffordshire =

University in Stoke-on-Trent, England

Coordinates: 53.0097°N 2.1817°W

- Coat of arms
- Former names: Central School of Science & Technology; North Staffordshire Technical College; Staffordshire Polytechnic; North Staffordshire Polytechnic; Staffordshire University
- Motto: Latin: Sapere Aude
- Motto in English: Dare to know
- Type: Public
- Established: 1906 – School of Mining; 1914 – Central School of Science & Technology; 1926 – North Staffordshire Technical College; 1970 – North Staffordshire Polytechnic; 1988 – Staffordshire Polytechnic; 1992 – gained university status as Staffordshire University
- Affiliations: MillionPlus; Association of Commonwealth Universities; Universities UK
- Endowment: £26,000 (2022)
- Budget: £150.4 million (2021–22)
- Chancellor: Levison Wood
- Vice-Chancellor: Philip Plowden
- Administrative staff: 1,375
- Students: 17,085 (2024/25)
- Undergraduates: 14,600 (2024/25)
- Postgraduates: 2,485 (2024/25)
- Location: Stoke-on-Trent, Stafford, London, United Kingdom
- Campus: Urban and rural
- Colours: Red and white
- Website: staffs.ac.uk

The University of Staffordshire (abbreviated as Staffs in post-nominal letters) is a public research university in Staffordshire, England. It has its main campus in Stoke-on-Trent and two other campuses in Stafford, and London.

== History ==
In 1901, industrialist Alfred Bolton acquired a 2-acre (8,100 m^{2}) site on what is now College Road and in 1906 mining classes began there. In 1907, pottery classes followed, being transferred from Tunstall into temporary buildings, and in 1914 the building now known as the Cadman Building was officially opened as the Central School of Science and Technology by J. A. Pease, President of the Board of Education. A frieze over the entrance depicts potters and miners. In 2013, the Library Conference room in the Cadman Building was renamed the Alfred Bolton Room.

In 1915, a department was established for the commercial production of Seger cones used to measure and control the temperatures of ceramic furnaces, based upon research completed by the principal, Joseph Mellor. Grants from the Carnegie United Kingdom Trust in 1924 were used to develop the ceramics library and in 1926 the name of the institution was changed to North Staffordshire Technical College. By 1931 extensions to the Cadman Building ran along Station Road and housed the Mining Department. A grant was awarded from the Miners’ Welfare Fund to fund the building work. The new extension also housed the library, which by now had 35,000 volumes. By 1934 the college consisted of four departments: Engineering (nearly 800 students), Pottery (just over 600 students), Mining (just under 500 students), and Chemistry (under 300 students). In 1939, new engineering workshops were occupied for the first time and the land opposite the Cadman Building was purchased. By 1950 Victoria Road had been renamed College Road and the site now extended over 12 acres (49,000 m^{2}). The Mellor Building and Experimental Production Block (now Dwight Building) were constructed for the North Staffordshire College of Technology by 1960.

Various faculty movements and further building work resulted in North Staffordshire Polytechnic being formed in 1970 with the merger of Stoke-on-Trent College of Art, North Staffordshire College of Technology (both based in Stoke-on-Trent), and Staffordshire College of Technology in Stafford. In 1977, the polytechnic absorbed Madeley College of Education, formerly County of Stafford Training College, a teacher training facility in Madeley, Staffordshire specialising in physical education.

The polytechnic developed traditional strengths of the component institutions, e.g. ceramics (Stoke-on-Trent), computing (Stafford) and sports education (Madeley). The mining department closed as result of the decline of coal mining in the 1980s. New subjects were developed. North Staffordshire Polytechnic was among only a handful of third-level institutions in the UK to offer International Relations as a dedicated degree. The 1992 UK government Research Assessment Exercise placed the International Relations Department as the highest-rated in the institution.

In 1988, the institution changed its name to Staffordshire Polytechnic. In 1992, following Further and Higher Education Act 1992, Staffordshire Polytechnic gained university title, became Staffordshire University, one of the new universities based on former polytechnics. On 23 September 2024, the university was rebranded as University of Staffordshire. following an Office for Students's approval. following an 18 month long process involving internal stakeholders in conjunction with RBL brand agency based in Lexington Spa. The project was led by Richard Shepherd (Head of Strategic Marketing) and Tim Deville (Brand Officer) at the University through all stages of brand development and activation.

== Campuses ==
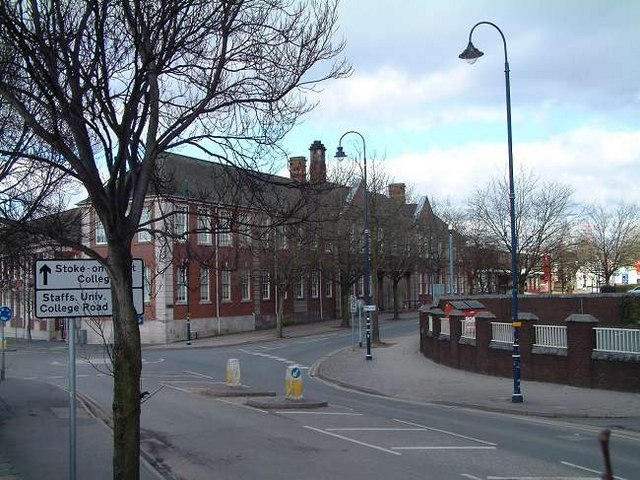
Staffordshire University, College Road, Stoke. The building shown is the former technical college, opened 1914

The university has its main campus in Stoke-on-Trent, and two other campuses in Stafford and London.

=== Stoke-on-Trent ===
The main campus is in Shelton, Stoke-on-Trent, and primarily offers law, business, sciences, applied computing, engineering, arts, design, games, journalism and media production courses. These are split into two areas, one on College Road (on the site of the former County Cricket Ground), and the other on Leek Road. A Science Centre was opened in 2012 as part of a major redevelopment adjacent to Stoke-on-Trent railway station. In 2022, the University opened a new £42 million building on the Leek Road site - The Catalyst. This 8,800 sqm, four storey building, brought together the delivery of apprenticeships and skills.

The Stoke campus also features its own student nightclub called LRV (Leek Road Venue). This nightclub hosts a variety of student nights on various days of the week but its main open nights are on a Wednesday and Friday.

A public film theatre is situated on the side of the Flaxman building on College Road, which shows mainstream and independent films on a regular basis to an audience of up to 180 people, as well as being used for large lectures. In 2006, a TV studio facility was opened by former BBC Director General Greg Dyke in the Arts, Media and Design faculty building on College Road, Stoke. The £1 million development features up-to-date technology and industry specification equipment.

The Stoke-on-Trent campus is also home to the Sir Stanley Matthews Sports Centre. Named after Stoke City footballer Sir Stanley Matthews CBE, the sports centre is located on Leek Road campus and is open to students, staff and the public.

=== University of Staffordshire London: Digital Institute ===
Located at Here East in East London, the Digital Institute opened in 2019 and is focused on new and emerging technology, primarily based around Games and Computing courses, key specialisms of the University since the 1960s. In 2021, the university invested £3.5m to increase its footprint to 31,133 sq feet, and allow the provider to expand the range of courses it has on offer for 2022.

=== Stafford ===
Nursing, midwifery, operating department practice and paramedic science courses are taught at the "Centre of Excellence" in Stafford on Blackheath Lane. In March 2022, the university opened the £5.8 million Centre for Health Innovation. The new Centre was part-funded by Stoke-on-Trent & Staffordshire Local Enterprise Partnership (LEP) via the Government’s Getting Building Fund. The LEP allocated £2.89m to the scheme to help bring forward the pioneering facility and generate further opportunity for learners and businesses in the area.

As well as being the study base for more than 2,000 student nurses, midwives, operating department practitioners and paramedics, the Centre also offers a platform for new collaborations with local business and healthcare and technology industries.

=== Overseas affiliation ===
The university has many overseas students studying for University of Staffordshire awards in China, Sri Lanka and Vietnam.

- China: Guangxi Minzu University, offering BSc (Hons) International Finance and Accounting.
- Sri Lanka: Asia Pacific Institute of Information Technology (Colombo and Kandy), offering undergraduate and postgraduate taught programmes in Business, Engineering, Biomedical Science, Computer Science, Finance, Law, and Psychology.
- Vietnam: British University Vietnam, offering undergraduate and postgraduate taught programmes in Business, Computer Science, Games, Creative Practices, and Finance.

=== Former campuses ===
In 1998, in partnership with Tamworth and Lichfield College, the university opened a campus in Lichfield. The Shrewsbury campus was mainly for nursing and midwifery courses, and was located in the neighbouring county of Shropshire.

=== Halls of residence ===
The university offers guaranteed accommodation for all first-year students, provided the university is their firm UCAS choice. All accommodation is situated close to all teaching, sporting, and Union venues.

==== Stafford ====
The Stafford campus has its own halls of residence, Stafford Court, comprising over 264 en-suite single study bedrooms and 290 single study bedrooms with shared facilities. The various houses take their names from villages in Staffordshire: Brocton, Derrington, Eccleshall, Gnosall, Haughton, Knightley, Levedale, Milwich, Norbury, Ranton, Shugborough and Weston. A separate block of larger flats, named after the village of Yarlet (previously Beckett Hall), is also on the same site. This comprises an additional 51 single-study bedrooms over three floors, each accommodating 17 residents, who share a kitchen, dining room and four shower rooms. All of these halls are directly opposite the Stafford campus buildings on Weston Road. By September 2016 only the midwifery, nursing, paramedic science, operation department practitioners and other allied and public health courses will remain at the Blackheath Lane site (Stafford) with the rest moved to Stoke.

==== Stoke ====
At Stoke, halls of residence are primarily situated on the Leek Road campus. The shared-bathroom accommodation was sponsored by various local potteries, and halls are therefore named after them, for example Royal Doulton, Coalport, Mintons, Spode, Aynsley and Wedgwood halls. The on-campus en-suite accommodation is contained within Clarice Cliff Court, comprising seven halls, each of about 30 students over three floors, each hall named after female ceramicists: Rachel Bishop, Eve Midwinter, Jessie van Hallen, Charlotte Rhead, Jessie Tait, Millicent Taplin and Star Wedgwood. Along with the halls and en-suite, the university also offers 32 houses, known as the Leek Road Houses, each of which accommodates up to 6 people each.

Carlton House, Etruscan House, Caledonia Road, Queen Anne Street Flats, Cromwell Court, Church Street and Sovereign House are situated off campus. They are all within 2 kilometers (1.2 mi) of the Stoke Campus, and are reserved for postgraduate and returning (second and third year) students. The Shelton area of Stoke is where many students choose to live after their first year. The proximity of Shelton to the university and the large quantity of student accommodation has effectively turned it into a mini-student village. Alternatively, there are also the College Court Halls, which are privately run but operate in a similar way to university-run halls. They are situated opposite Hanley Park and are close to the university.

== Organisation ==
Shield of the University of Staffordshire

The university restructured in 2021 and has now two academic schools, including University of Staffordshire London.

- School of Digital,Technology, Innovation and Business
- School of Health, Education, Policing and Sciences

=== University of Staffordshire Services ===
As of 1 April 2021, all new academic and professional services staff are employed by the University of Staffordshire Services - which the University describes as 'a wholly owned subsidiary company of the University of Staffordshire. Staff employed by the University of Staffordshire Services have no access to the defined benefit Teachers' Pension Scheme and instead join a new defined contribution scheme that does not guarantee a set level of income in retirement.

The University and College Union claimed that this would create a "two tier workforce".

In March 2022, Almost three-quarters (70 per cent) of staff backed strike action over the matter.

== Academic profile ==
The School of Computing was originally situated at Blackheath Lane on the edge of Stafford in GEC's former Nelson Research Laboratory. It offered one of the first BSc courses in computing in the United Kingdom and its first major computer was a second hand DEUCE. The School of Computing later moved to a purpose-built building on the Beaconside campus, the Octagon, constructed in 1992 when university status had been achieved.

Rankings
National rankings
- Complete (2027): 94=
- Guardian (2027): 82
- Times / Sunday Times (2027): 87=

Global rankings
- THE (2026): 1201–1500

The university was the first institution to introduce a single honours degree in Film, Television and Radio Studies in 1990. A new Media Centre was opened by Greg Dyke in 2005, comprising radio studios, television news desk and broadcast journalist suite. Courses in print, broadcast and sports journalism are nationally accredited by the National Council for the Training of Journalists and the Broadcast Journalism Training Council.

The Forensic Science degrees (Forensic Science, Forensic Science and Criminology and Forensic Science and Psychology) were accredited by the Forensic Science Society (FSC) in 2007, one of four universities whose courses have been acknowledged for teaching services and high academic quality. The Forensic theme is continued with a specialist Forensic Biology degree and on the Stafford Campus the Faculty of Computing Engineering and Technology was one of the first university faculties in the UK to offer undergraduate and postgraduate degrees in the new field of Forensic Computing.

=== League table rankings ===
The university's world ranking is 1,354 in 2010, according to webometrics.info. The University also achieved the following rankings for 2027: 34th out of 118 in the Guardian University Guide 2027, 51st out of 130 in The Times and Sunday Times Good University Guide 2027, and 38th out of 127 in the Daily Mail University Guide 2027.

=== Awards ===
The University won Modern University of the Year 2027 in the Daily Mail University Guide 2027 and the University of the Year for Employability in the Academic Employability Awards 2026 by the Graduate Future Institute.

=== Use of Artificial Intelligence for teaching ===
The University of Staffordshire has allegedly been providing AI-generated courses that were in large part taught by AI.

== Student life ==
=== Students' Union ===
University of Staffordshire Students' Union aims to represent students at the university. Constitutionally it is governed by the student body, who annually elect a student council which is responsible for the organisation of the Union. The day-to-day operation of the union is handled by four Sabbatical Officers and four student trustees, who are held to account by the Council. All officer positions, bar the four sabbatical officers, work on a part-time basis.

=== Sports ===
Since 2007, the University of Staffordshire (Stoke Campus) and Keele University have engaged in an annual varsity match. In 2013, the University of Staffordshire (Stafford Campus) and the University of Wolverhampton engaged in an annual varsity match. In 2021, the university tied up with Indian Super League club Odisha FC under the later's Education and Community partnership Program

== Notable alumni ==
=== Academia and Science ===
- David Bolt, Academic specialising in literature and disability
- Paul Reilly, Computer scientist
- Zhengxu Zhao, Scientist of space mission visualisation and control.

=== Arts and Media ===
- Peter Bebb, special effect artist
- Ian Clark, film director and screenwriter
- Jim Davies, Guitarist for The Prodigy and Pitchshifter
- Marcus Dillistone, Film Director and music producer
- Dale Vince, green energy pioneer and boss of Ecotricity
- John Robb, journalist and musician
- Alex Frost, artist
- Raimi Gbadamosi, Conceptual artist
- Dave Gorman, English author, comedian, and television presenter
- Michael Greco, Soap actor
- Paul Harvey, Stuckist artist
- Emma Jones, Tabloid journalist
- Edward Lay, Drummer for rock band Editors
- David Leach, Studio potter
- Russell Leetch, Bass guitarist for rock band Editors
- Ian McMillan, Poet
- Tom Smith, Lead singer for rock band Editors
- Chris Urbanowicz, Lead Guitarist for rock band Editors

=== Politics and Service ===
- Shafie Apdal, Chief Minister of Sabah
- Avdullah Hoti, Prime Minister of Kosovo
- Fatmir Besimi, Minister of the Economy of the Republic of Macedonia
- Michelle Brown, UKIP Member of the National Assembly for Wales
- Abdul Ghafar Ismail, Bruneian diplomat
- Jane Kambalame, Malawi High Commissioner to Zimbabwe and Botswana
- Tim Field, Founder of the UK National Workplace Bullying Advice Line
- Mike O'Brien, Former Labour MP and Minister of State for Health Services
- Jared O'Mara, Former Labour MP for Sheffield Hallam
- Artane Rizvanolli, minister of economy of Kosovo
- David Kwaku Ziga, Ghanaian potter and politician

=== Sports ===
- Matt Baker, Professional footballer
- Chris Beardsley, Professional footballer
- James Beaumont, Professional footballer
- George Berry, Professional footballer and Welsh international
- Kate Dennison, Pole vaulter and current British record holder
- Josh Gordon, Professional footballer
- John Mayock, Athlete and olympian
- Scott Minto, Professional footballer and sports broadcaster
- Fabrice Muamba, Professional footballer
- Graham Shaw, Professional football
- Sam Stockley, Professional footballer
- Gavin Strachan, Professional footballer
- Andrew Triggs Hodge, Olympic gold medallist and World Champion rower
- Mark Wallace, Cricketer

== Arts alumni ==
Many famous artists produced by the former art schools of Stoke-on-Trent can be regarded as alumni, as the university is the successor institution.

- Burslem School of Art
  - William Bowyer, Artist
  - Clarice Cliff, Ceramic artist
  - Susie Cooper, Ceramic artist
  - Jessie Tait, Ceramic artist
  - Sidney Tushingham, Artist and etcher
- Fenton School of Art
  - Charlotte Rhead, Ceramic artist
- Stoke School of Art
  - Arnold Machin, Coin and stamp designer

== See also ==
- Armorial of UK universities
- List of universities in the UK
- Post-1992 universities
