= Millicent Taplin =

British ceramics designer

Millicent Taplin at Wedgwood

Millicent (Millie) Jane Taplin (1902–1980) was a British designer and painter of ceramics who spent most of her career at Josiah Wedgwood and Sons (1917–1962). She was trained in painting by Alfred and Louise Powell, and supervised Wedgwood's ceramics painters. She became a designer of decorative patterns in 1929 and by the mid-to-late 1930s was one of the company's main designers, although she did not design pottery shapes. She was one of only two working-class women to become a successful ceramics designer before the Second World War. Her tableware designs were exhibited by Wedgwood at Grafton Galleries in London in 1936, and several of her designs are now on display at the V&A Museum. Her design "Strawberry Hill", with Victor Skellern, was awarded the Council of Industrial Design's Design of the Year Award in 1957.

== Early life and education ==
Millicent Jane Taplin was born in 1902. Her father, John William Taplin, worked at casting sanitary ware. She attended school only until the age of 13, leaving to find employment in a milliner's shop. She took evening classes in art at Stoke School of Art, after being awarded a three-year scholarship, studying not only pottery decoration but also still lifes and botanical drawing, but did not study art full time.

== Career ==
Taplin began her career in the Staffordshire pottery industry at Green and Co. in Fenton, where she was employed in gilding. She then started to learn the craft of ceramic painting at Mintons. In 1917 she moved to Josiah Wedgwood and Sons at their Etruria Works, where she continued her training as a painter, learning freehand painting under the supervision of Alfred and Louise Powell. When her training was completed, she worked as one of around twenty hand-paintresses for the company. In around 1926 she is recorded as a student at the Burslem School of Art. (Note: Possibly Hanley School of Art.) In 1928 (Note: 1926 in one source.) she was promoted to supervise the paintresses at the newly established hand-decorating studio at the Etruria Works – from 1929, also including the hand-painting department – and continued in this role at the new Wedgwood factory in Barlaston. She was a member of the Society of Industrial Artists from 1932.

Taplin began to adapt designs by the Powells from the mid-1920s; her own first designs date from 1928. In 1929 she was recognised as a designer, and by the mid-to-late 1930s was numbered among Wedgwood's main designers. With Clarice Cliff, she was one of two working-class women to achieve success as a designer in the interwar period. Many of the other women designers at this time were middle class in origin, and they often had close relatives who were designers or artists; lower-class women in the industry were usually restricted to non-creative roles such as dipping. Taplin originated patterns for bone china, Queen's ware, earthenware and other types of pottery. Her designs in the 1920s were for ornamental ware; those of the 1930s were for tableware. Her earlier designs were for hand-painting, but after the Second World War, she also worked on lithographic printed designs. Like most women designers, Taplin only originated decorative patterns and did not create complete pottery designs, although some women such as Cliff and Susie Cooper did design both. Like other Wedgwood designers of the 1920s and 1930s, the designs were sold under her name, but only some of her work was individually identified, which was done via a painted monogram rather than a signature. She worked under the direct supervision of Victor Skellern, Wedgwood's art director from 1934, with whom she collaborated.

From 1956 Taplin headed the company's hand-painting section, covering both china and earthenware. She retired in 1962, having worked for Wedgwood for 45 years.

=== Designs and style ===
Among Taplin's early designs were "Kingcup" and "Sun-lit". In the mid-1930s she designed the "highly modern" "Moonlight"; "Winter Morn", with simple grey petals and leaves on a lavender background with silver highlights; and "Falling Leaves", a stylised leaf pattern in green and silver. "Moonlight", "Winter Morn" and "Falling Leaves" were among eleven Taplin designs chosen by Wedgwood for an exhibition of predominantly tableware at Grafton Galleries in London in 1936, along with a smaller number of works by Skellern, Star Wedgwood, Keith Murray, John Skeaping and others. According to Cheryl Buckley, these and other hand-painted designs of the 1930s were "simple, but bold" in their patterns, using "subtle" shades of green, grey, blue and lavender. Diane Taylor considers Taplin, Wedgwood and Skellern to present a "coherent stylistic approach... based upon simplicity and restraint", while Buckley characterises the work of male designers such as Skellern as more Modernist than that of Taplin and other contemporary Wedgwood women designers, such as Star Wedgwood and Daisy Makeig-Jones. Buckley considers that Taplin's tableware designs, as well as those of other women ceramics designers in the 1930s, represent "a clever application of modernism", working within the constraints on the British pottery industry of the time, finding a balance between modernist design and saleability to English consumers in a diminished market after the financial crash of 1929. They were reasonably inexpensive and targeted at relatively young purchasers with "some taste but no money". Amy Gale characterises Taplin as "conservative", stating that she "updat[ed] the tradition of floral decoration."

With Skellern, Taplin designed "Strawberry Hill" in around 1957, a particularly popular design for printed and gilded bone china, which received one of the earliest Council of Industrial Design's Design of the Year Award in 1957. Several of Taplin's designs are preserved in the permanent ceramics collection of the V&A Museum, including "Falling Leaves", "Strawberry Hill" and an unidentified earthenware design of around 1937. Examples of her designs and painted work are also in the permanent collections of the Wedgwood Museum, Barlaston and the Potteries Museum & Art Gallery in Stoke-on-Trent.

== Personal life ==
Taplin married in 1932, carrying on working for Wedgwood. In 1935 she taught painting and design at Stoke School of Art. Taplin died in 1980.
