= Sacred Heart Church, Tunstall =

Church of the Sacred Heart
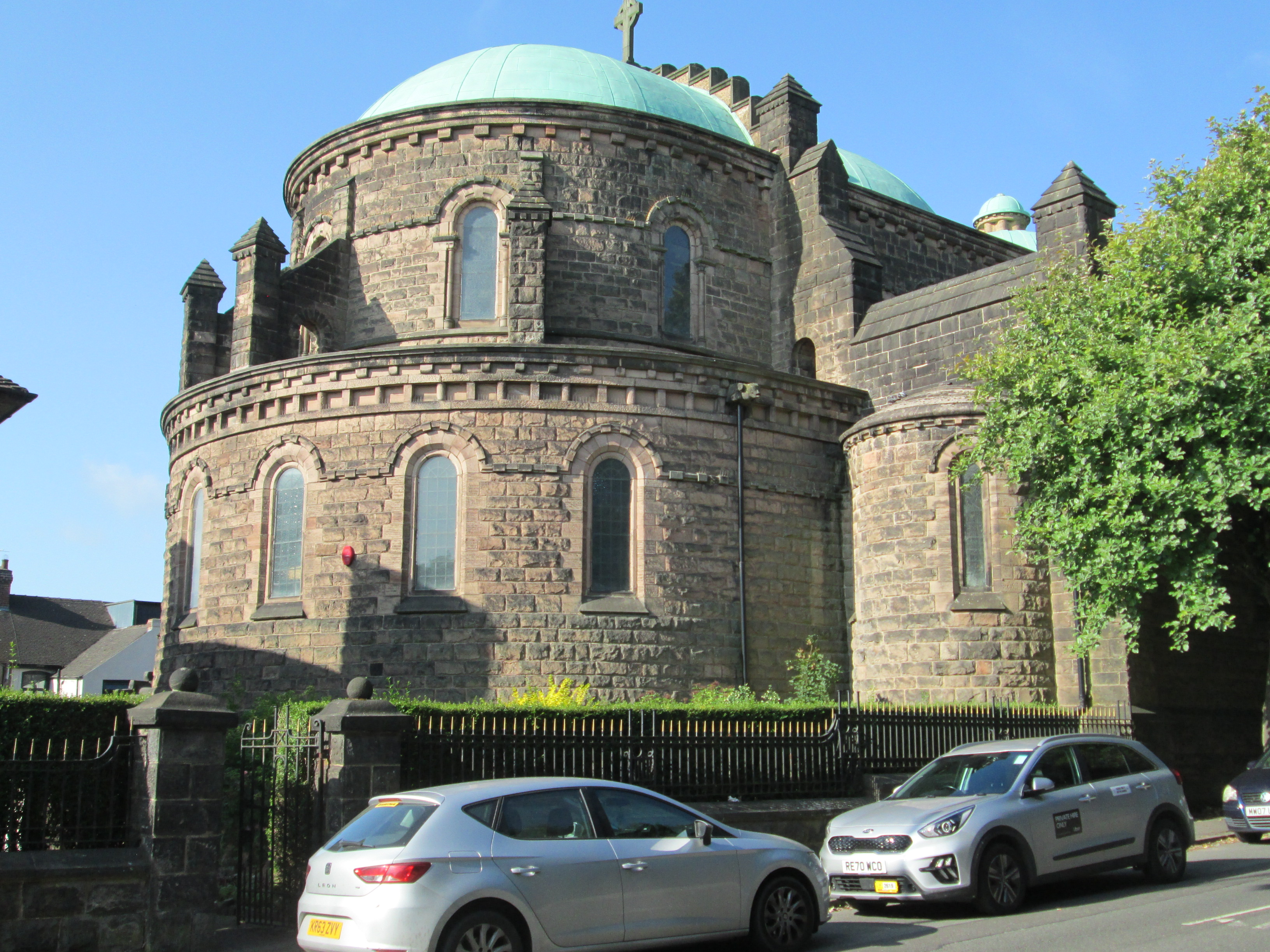
- The east end of the church
- Church of the Sacred Heart
- 53°03′31.73″N 2°12′13.49″W
- OS grid reference: SJ 86442 51304
- Location: Tunstall, Stoke-on-Trent
- Country: England
- Denomination: Roman Catholic
- Website: www.birminghamdiocese.org.uk/sacred-heart-tunstall

Architecture
- Heritage designation: Grade II listed
- Designated: 15 March 1993
- Architect(s): John Sydney Brocklesby; P. J. Ryan
- Completed: 1930

Administration
- Diocese: Archdiocese of Birmingham

Sacred Heart Church is a Roman Catholic church in Queen's Avenue in Tunstall, Stoke-on-Trent, England, and in the Archdiocese of Birmingham. The building, completed in 1930, is Grade II listed.

== History ==
A building containing a school and a chapel was built in 1853 in Plex Street, Tunstall, and had a resident priest from 1854. A new church, dedicated to St Mary, and presbytery were built in 1869 in Sun Street (now St Aidan's Street). St Mary's was in use until the opening in 1930 of the Church of the Sacred Heart in Queen's Avenue. The Sun Street building remained as a Sunday school until it was sold in 1934.

The foundation stone was laid by Bishop Thomas Shine in 1925. The church was originally by John Sydney Brocklesby, the architect of St Joseph's Church, Burslem; P. J. Ryan, the parish priest from 1903 to 1951, initially clerk of works for this building, completed the design. It was opened by Archbishop Richard Downey in 1930.

== Description ==
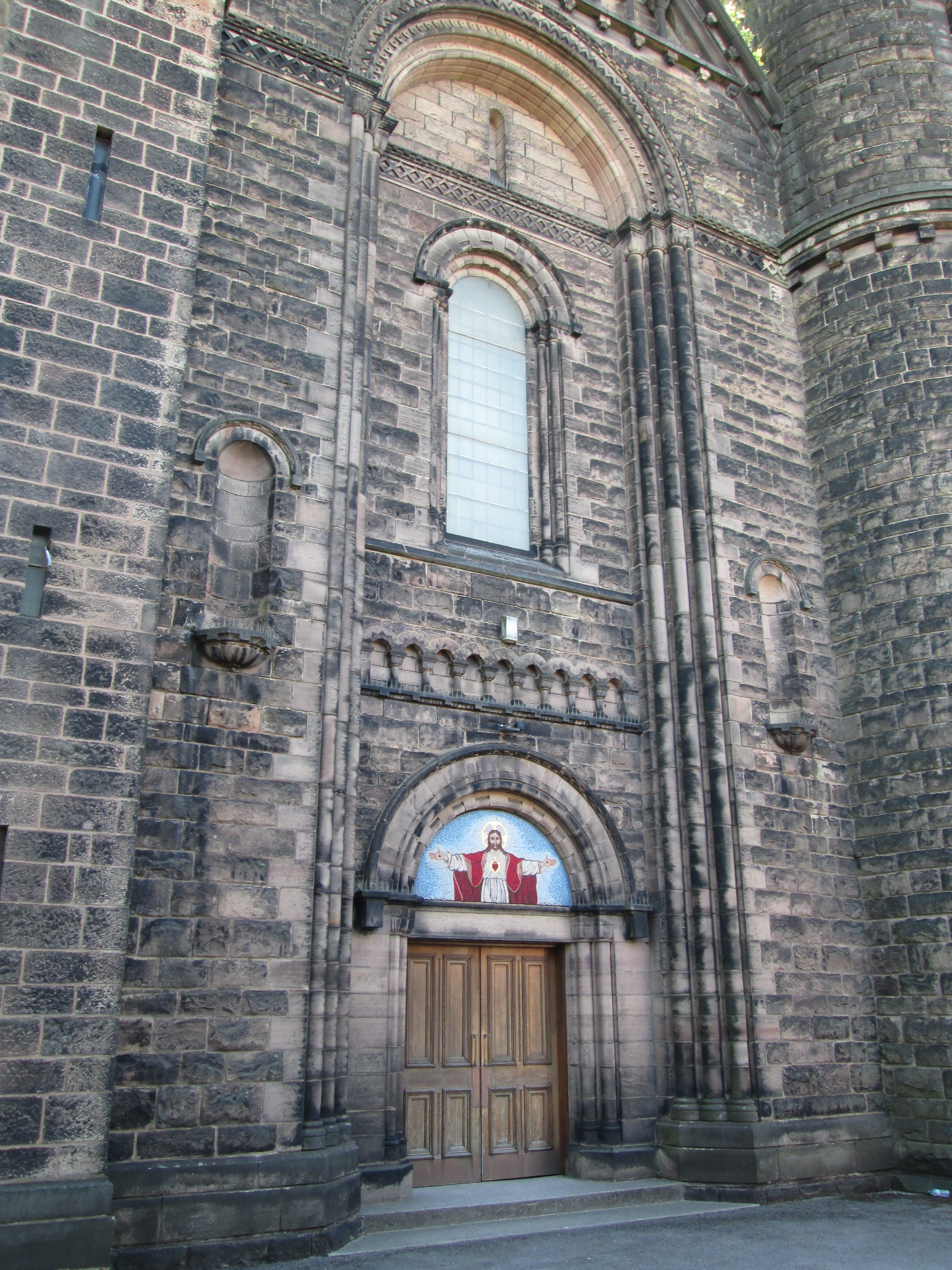
The west door

The building, of Derbyshire stone, is in Romanesque style. It has a tower in the north-west, and a campanile, and it is roofed with a series of three copper domes. The west door has a large arch with chevron mouldings.

=== Interior ===
There is a nave and clerestory, two aisles, and an apsidal chancel with an ambulatory. The main altar, and altars in side chapels in the north aisle, are of marble, decorated with inlay and mosaic.

The stained glass, bench-carvings and some ironwork were created by young parishioners under the guidance of Gordon Forsyth, director of the Burslem School of Art. There are furnishings bought abroad by Fr. Ryan.
