= Queen Street, Burslem =

Street in Burslem, Stoke-on-Trent, England

- Wedgwood Institute, Queen Street, in 2011

- Location within Staffordshire
- Location: Burslem, Stoke-on-Trent
- Coordinates: 53°02′41.1″N 2°11′50.4″W
- East: Swan Square; Waterloo Road
- West: St John's Square

Queen Street is a street in Burslem, Stoke-on-Trent, England. It is part of the town centre, adjacent to St John's Square to the west and Swan Square and Waterloo Road to the east, and a short distance south of the Market Place. Several building are situated along the street, that are important in the history of the town and are architecturally significant.

== History ==
Queen Street, along with St John's Square, Market Place, Swan Square and Wedgwood Street, are the later names of the oldest part of Burslem, in existence by the mid 18th century, when the town was an isolated settlement and pottery-making was still on a small scale.

Josiah Wedgwood was tenant of the Brick House Works, situated immediately north of the later Queen Street, from 1762 to 1770. During this period he became well-known, producing cream-coloured ware and black Etruscan ware, and was appointed potter to Queen Charlotte, wife of King George III. Queen Street was so named to commemorate this.

The Brick House was the earliest important potworks in Burslem, in use in the mid 17th century; it got its name since, unusually for the time, it was built of brick instead of timber. Brick House Street, running north from Queen Street, was named after the building.

== Listed buildings ==
There are several listed buildings on Queen Street:

The building at the east end of Queen Street on the south side (nos. 1 and 1A), at the junction with Waterloo Road, with its outbuildings, was the original of the printing works in Arnold Bennett's Clayhanger. It is a brick building of three storeys, dating from the early 19th century, now shop premises. It is Grade II listed.

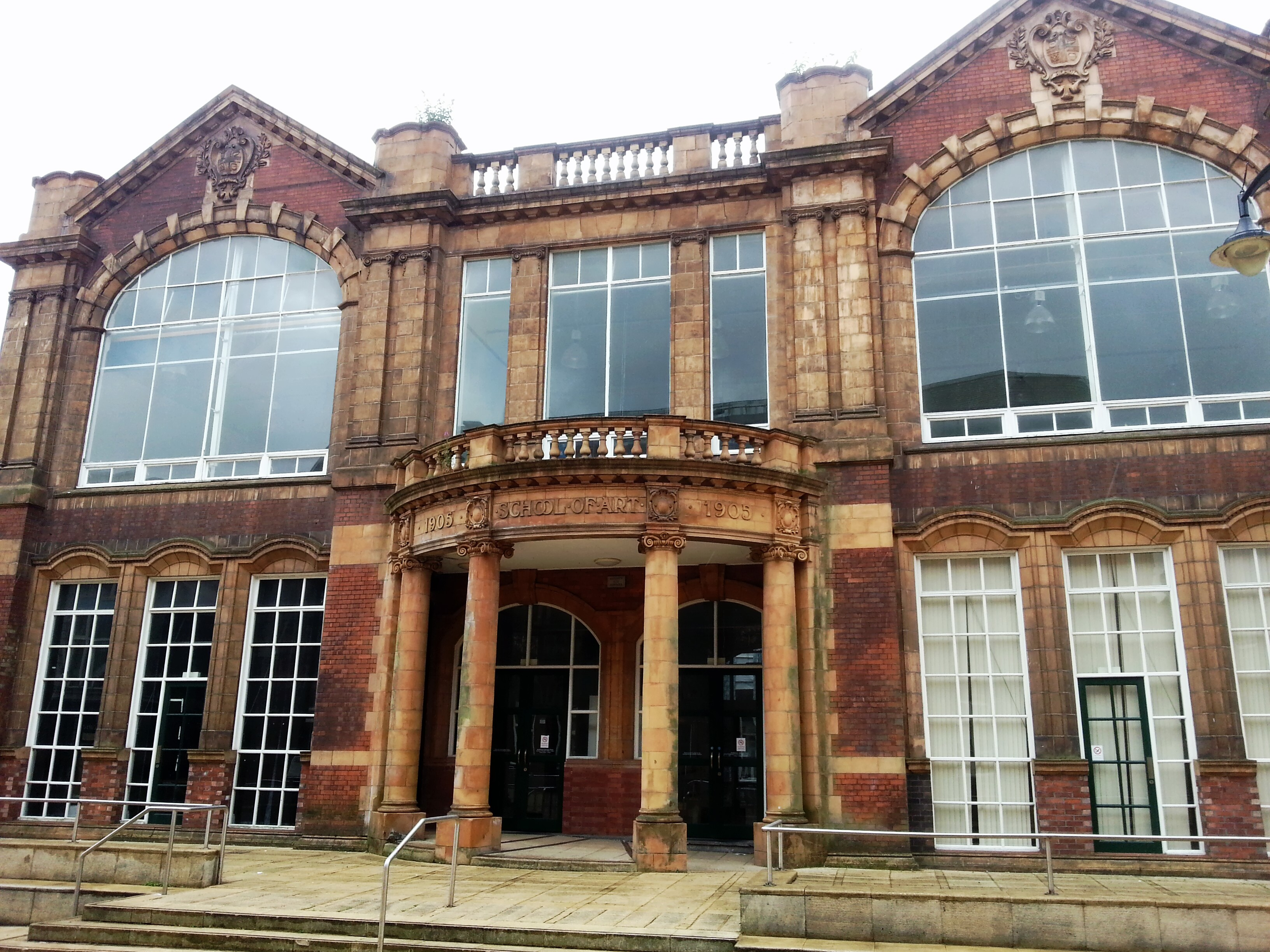
Burslem School of Art

The former Wedgwood Institute, on the north side of Queen Street, is a Grade II* listed building. It was built in 1869, with funds raised by public subscription to make education available to working people, and to be the principal arts school in the Potteries. It features in the works of Arnold Bennett. There is a bust of Josiah Wedgwood above the entrance; terracotta panels depict stages in the manufacture of pottery, and above these terracotta panels illustrate the months of the year. The bust and panels were by Rowland Morris (1841–1898), a modeller and designer of ceramics in Stoke-on-Trent. It has been unoccupied since 2008. In recent years it became derelict and was placed on Historic England's Heritage at Risk Register, assessed to be in poor condition and slowly decaying.

Burslem School of Art lies opposite the Wedgwood Institute. The architect was Absalom Reade Wood (1851–1922), who designed many buildings in the local area including Tunstall Town Hall and Kidsgrove Town Hall, and also designed Victoria Park in Tunstall. The foundation stone was laid in 1906 by the Earl of Dartmouth, and it opened in 1907. It is built of brick with terracotta details; it is Grade II listed. Former students include Clarice Cliff, Susie Cooper and William Bowyer.

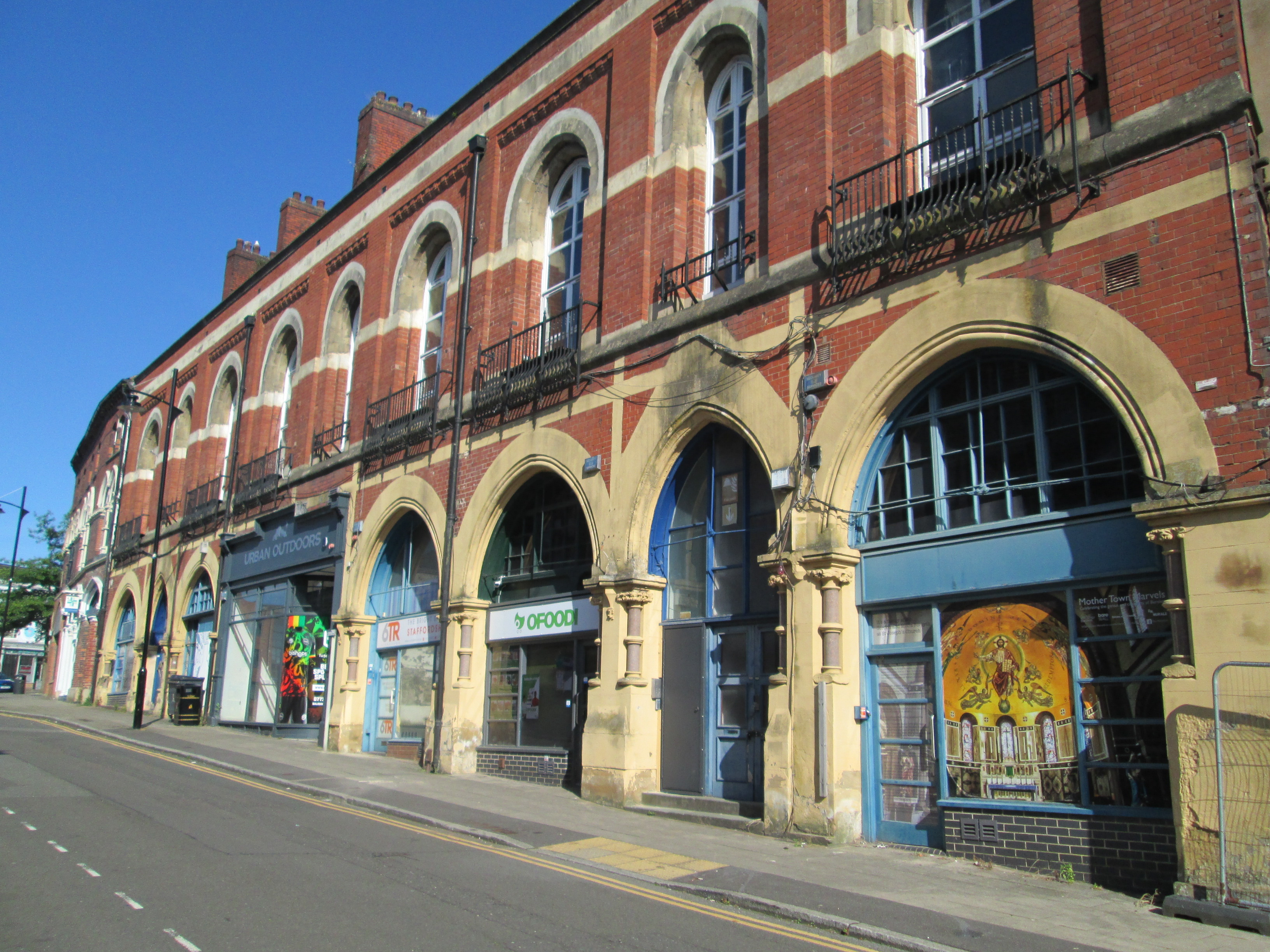
Part of the north side of Queen Street, built as the frontage of the Market Hall

Burslem Market Hall, between the Market Place to the north and Queen Street to the south, has a frontage on Queen Street, a short distance west of the Wedgwood Institute. It is in red brick with stone details, and was opened in 1879. It closed in 2003, after masonry fell from the ceiling. The Victorian Society in 2021, commenting that it is in need of vital repairs, placed it among its top 10 endangered buildings. The Society described the building: "The market tells the story of Burslem’s rise and subsequent decline, with its ghost signs and fading advertisements from the Victorian era...." It was given listed status, Grade II, in December 2022.

The buildings at the west end of Queen Street (nos. 36–40), on a curve into St John's Square, is a group of shops with three storeys, built in 1868, of brick with stone details. It was the original of "Daniel Povey's Confectioners" in Bennett's The Old Wives' Tale. It is Grade II listed.

== Public realm improvements ==
It was reported in February 2025 that public realms in three town centres in the City of Stoke-on-Trent—Burslem, Tunstall and Stoke-upon-Trent—will be improved, using government funding.

In Burslem, the improvements will be in Queen Street. The aims of the scheme are to provide a more attractive environment and encourage more people into Burslem town centre; to improve business confidence and civic pride; and to improve pedestrian routes into the town centre from new housing developments. The work is planned to start later in 2025.
