= Moira Forsyth =

British stained glass artist (1905-1991)

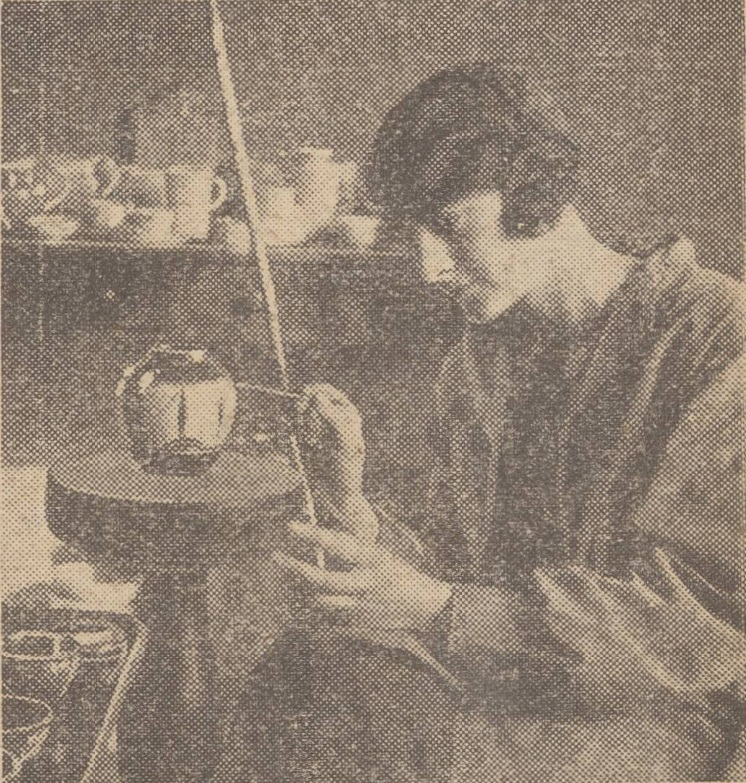
- Moira Forsyth in her studio in 1926
- Born: 3 May 1905; Stafford, Staffordshire, England
- Died: 19 March 1991 (aged 85); Farnham, Surrey, England
- Education: Burslem School of Art, Royal College of Art
- Known for: Stained glass
- Notable work: Stained glass windows for Guildford Cathedral, Norwich Cathedral
- Movement: Arts and Crafts movement
- Relatives: Gordon Forsyth (father)
- Awards: Queen's award for lifelong services to the arts
- Elected: President, Society of Catholic Artists

Moira Forsyth (3 May 1905 – 19 March 1991) was an English stained-glass artist who designed and manufactured windows for churches across the United Kingdom. Her work is most closely associated with the later period of the Arts and Crafts movement in England. Among Forsyth's most notable commissions are windows for the Anglican cathedrals of Guildford and Norwich. Forsyth also practiced as a ceramicist, particularly during the early part of her career.

== Early life and education ==
Moira Forsyth was born in Creswell, Staffordshire, on 3 May 1905. Her father, Gordon Forsyth, was a Scottish ceramicist and teacher, who had been appointed art director of the Minton Hollins & Co tileworks in Stoke-on-Trent in 1903. In 1906 the family moved to Manchester when Forsyth's father took up a position at Pilkington's Tile & Pottery Company. The family returned to Staffordshire in 1920 when he was appointed to the position of Superintendent of Art Instruction for Stoke-on-Trent City Art Schools.

== Early career in ceramics ==
Forsyth's decision to pursue a career in the applied arts was heavily influenced by her father. In 1921 she entered the Burslem School of Art, where he was principal. Studying under him, she created and exhibited works, primarily in the medium of ceramics. In 1925 Forsyth opened her own ceramics studio in Stoke-on-Trent. She found early success, exhibiting to some acclaim at the British Industries Fair at White City in London in February 1926. Examples of Forsyth's ceramic lustreware made during this period are held in the collection of the Potteries Museum & Art Gallery and demonstrate her early adherence to the Arts and Crafts style. However, due to the 1926 general strike when the kilns in Stoke-on-Trent were not operating, Forsyth was forced to close down her studio.

== Transition to stained glass ==
Faced with unemployment, in 1926 Forsyth applied for and won a national scholarship to the Royal College of Art in London to study pottery. However, a visit to Chartres Cathedral convinced Forsyth to refocus her studies on glass design under the tutelage of Martin Travers, who had recently been appointed chief instructor in stained glass at the RCA. Among Forsyth's archive (which is preserved in the Victoria and Albert Museum) is an undated note that provides some insight into her motivations for this change in professional direction. In it, Forsyth describes stained glass manufacturing as "not specifically a career for women ... physically tiring and heavy work. But for the enthusiast for light and colour, perhaps the most wonderful medium in the world". She later wrote that "I know of no medium, other than that of music, capable of saying more effectively 'Sursum corda' – lift up your hearts!"

Having graduated from the RCA, Forsyth joined the Glass House Studio in Fulham sometime around 1930. The Glass House Studio had been established in 1906 by the Arts and Crafts artist and suffragist Mary Lowndes as a purpose-built glass workshop for the use of independent artists. Many leading 20th century names would come to be associated with it, including several female artists such as Wilhelmina Geddes. During her early years at the Glass House Studio, Forsyth would produce designs for the firm of Lowndes and Drury, continuing to work in their typical Arts and Crafts idiom. Forsyth would remain in Fulham for more than 40 years, later moving to St Oswald's Studios.

In 1930 Forsyth submitted her portfolio to Heal's department store on Tottenham Court Road, where the artistic director, Prudence Maufe, was sufficiently impressed to commission her to design that year's Christmas catalogue. This patronage would prove to be highly significant for Forsyth's future career. In 1933 Prudence's husband,Edward Maufe, was appointed as architect for the new church of St Thomas the Apostle, Hanwell. His brief allowed for the engagement of a number of emerging artists to produce new work for the church, among whom was Eric Gill. However, it was through Prudence that Edward was introduced to three female artists, Kathleen Roberts, Elisabeth Starling and Forsyth. The engagement that followed, for two sets of windows, was Forsyth's first formal commission in stained glass. The four panels she made for the Children's chapel, showing children playing in a forest with angels, was exhibited at the Royal Academy of Arts before being installed.

Forsyth worked in the Ministry of Town and Country Planning during the Second World War.

== Major works ==
=== Church of St Joseph, Hanwell ===
While Forsyth was primarily engaged on commissions for glass, her practice would continue to encompass other media. A key example is the mural that she designed and painted for St Joseph's catholic church in Burslem between 1935 and 1937, a hemispherical ceiling painting in the sanctuary depicting Christ in Glory against a gold background. The Roman Catholic church had been constructed between 1925 and 1927 on the initiative of the local priest as a social endeavour. Paid for by public subscription, it was built to the design of John Sydney Brocklesby by unemployed miners and potters for the price of a free meal a day. Forsyth's father had been engaged on the interior decoration from early on in its development, designing the stained glass that was cut and constructed by these same men. As committed catholics, both he and Forsyth provided their services for free as a gift to the church.

=== Guildford Cathedral ===
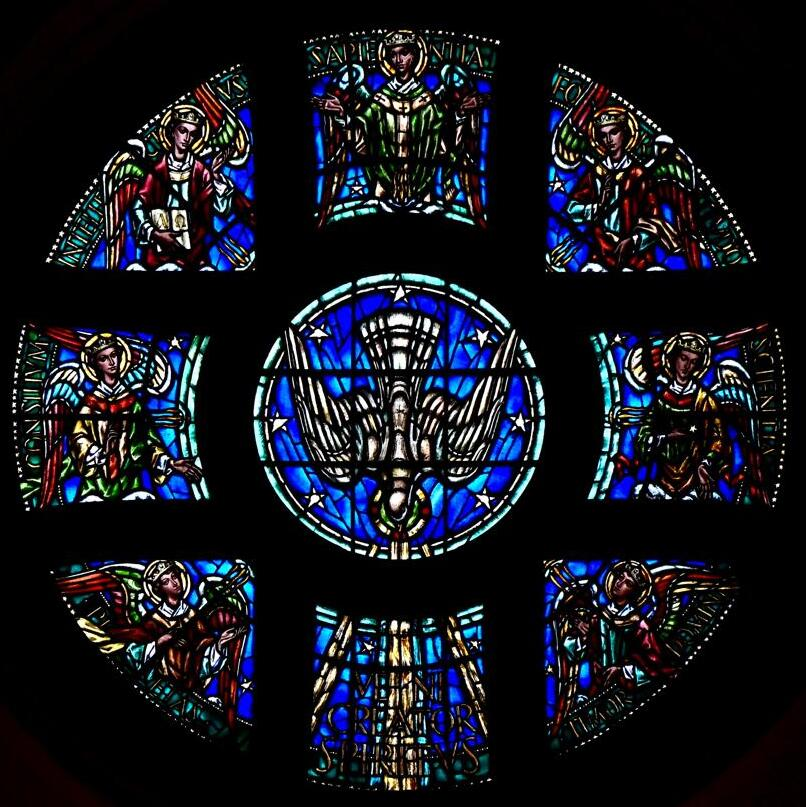
Guildford Cathedral rose window

Forsyth's first major assignment for stained glass came through the professional relationship she had established with Gerald Maufe. In 1932, Maufe had won the competition to design the new cathedral for Guildford, a project that would take many years to realise. In 1939, Maufe asked Forsyth to provide a design for the rose window that was to be positioned high up in the east chancel wall. Visible from the west entrance, it is among the most prominent works of art in an otherwise relatively plainly decorated modern Gothic interior. While Maufe had previously exercised paternalistic influence over Forsyth's designs for St Thomas's Church in 1933, at Guildford she was afforded more creative agency. In response to the brief she landed on what would become her own distinct approach to late Arts and Crafts style, one that would be mirrored in much of Forsyth's later work. The window incorporates the Gifts of the Holy Spirit - to which the cathedral is dedicated - against a background of shimmering blue Norman slab glass. Its circular frame has stone mullions that form a voided cross dividing the glass into nine sections – a circular panel to the centre depicting the dove of the Holy Spirit and eight smaller surrounding panels, all but the lower one depicting an angel, which instead contains the legend "Veni Creator Spiritus" ("Come, Holy Spirit"). Dedicated in 1952, the window was partly made in Forsyth's London studio during the Second World War under difficult conditions that included bomb damage to the studio than partly ruined the cartoon. In total Forsyth produced 12 windows for the cathedral, the majority primarily situated in the south aisle.

=== St Columba's Church, Knightsbridge ===
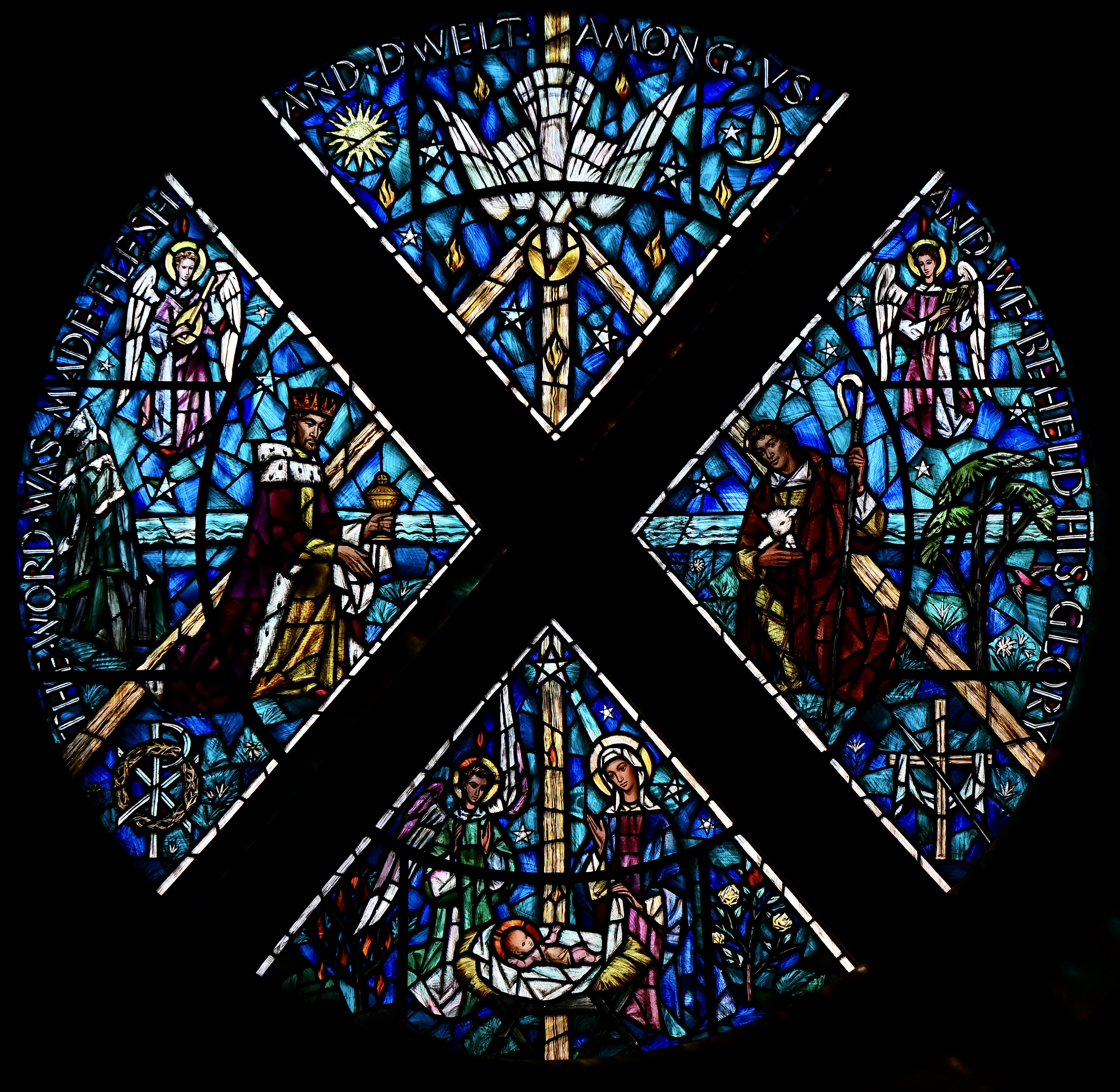
St Columba's Church rose window

Forsyth's productive partnership with Maufe continued at the Scottish Presbyterian church of St Columba in Knightsbridge, London. Built between 1950 and 1955 to replace a Victorian church lost during The Blitz, Maufe's design for St Columba shares many similarities of style with his cathedral at Guildford. This extends to the rose window, similarly installed high in the east chancel wall. Forsyth's design for the window shares the same blue background as that at Guildford, though here it is divided into four sections by mullions that form an intersecting cross of St Andrew. The four sections depict the dove of the Holy Spirit at the top, above the Nativity of Jesus. To either side is one of the Maji and a shepherd adoring the Christ Child. Around the edge is a quote from the Book of John, "The Word was made flesh and dwelt among us, and we beheld his glory". A second window by Forsyth can be found in the London Scottish Regimental Chapel south of the chancel. Installed in 1956, it takes the distinctive form of a narrow cross, filled with glass depicting a ceremonial sword.

=== Eton College Chapel ===
Between 1954 and 1959, Forsyth created eight armorial windows for the chapel of Eton College hourouring former headmasters, provosts and benefactors. One of her most significant commissions, Forsyth's windows for Eton, installed in the western end of the nave, four to the north and four to the south, form part of a complete reglazing scheme for the chapel following bomb damage during the Second World War, her work installed alongside that of Evie Hone and John Piper.

=== Church of the Holy Family, Heath End ===
The largest single body of work by Forsyth can be found at the Roman Catholic Church of the Holy Family in Heath End, Farnham, Surrey. This unassuming brick-built church opened in 1954 and was expanded in 1967 and 1971. Over a period of 16 years from 1960 Forsyth created 14 windows for church as it went through its various stages of construction. The highlight is the 1960 Epiphany window that dominates the east wall behind the altar. It was the first of her works for the church to be completed. In her retirement Forsyth moved to Farnham and was known to worship at the church.

=== Norwich Cathedral ===
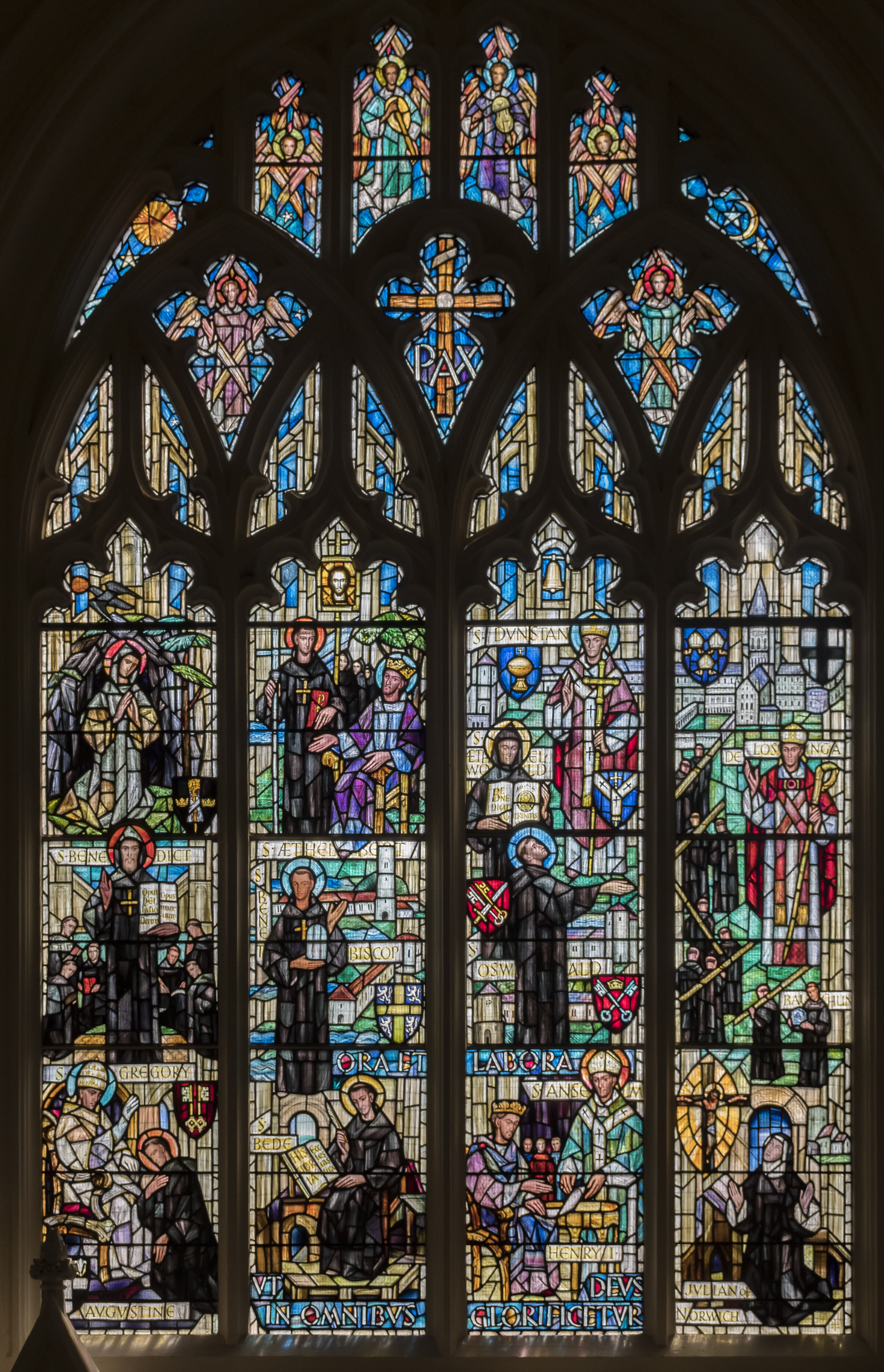
Norwich Cathedral Benedictine window

Among Forsyth's most significant commissions is the Benedictine window for Norwich Cathedral, located in the 14th-century Bauchun Chapel of Our Lady of Pity (named for its benefactor, William Bauchun). Dedicated in 1964, the window was given in memory of Harriet Campbell. Across four lights of Perpendicular Gothic tracery, it depicts the development of Benedictine monasticism from St Benedict’s career as a young hermit to the commissioning of St Augustine by the Benedictine Pope Gregory the Great and the accomplishments of notable monastics in England, including St Julian of Norwich and Herbert de Losinga. Forsyth's design includes the Benedictine mottoes Ora et Labora (pray and work) and Ut in omnibus glorificatur (God may be glorified in all things). It was said to be among Forsyth's own favourite works, in part because of the importance of leading in the design, and in part because of her love of lettering.

== Death and legacy ==
During her career Forsyth served as President of the International Society of Christian Artists and the Society of Catholic Artists. She also received the Queen's award for lifelong services to the arts.

Forsyth retired to Farnham in the late 1970s, where she died on 19 March 1991. Her requiem was held at St Joan of Arc's Church, Farnham where she was a member of the congregation. Her obituary, printed in the Catholic Herald on 26 April 1991, quoted from Forsyth's friend and fellow artist, Winefride Pruden:

To write that no-one ever found an unkind word to say about the Catholic artist Moira Forsyth, who died recently, might suggest a rather bland and insipid personality. Nothing would be farther from the truth: she could be trenchant in her opinions and judgements, and her wit was not without a touch of astringency.

Forsyth's archive is held in the collection of the Victoria and Albert Museum in London. Both the Victoria and Albert Museum and the Stained Glass Museum, Ely preserve examples of her work in glass in their collections.

== Selected works ==
- Church of St Thomas the Apostle, Hanwell, Ealing
  - Four glass panels for the Children's Chapel (1933)
  - Five glass panels for the Baptistry (1933)
- St Joseph's Church RC, Burslem, Stoke-on-Trent
  - Sanctuary mural - Christ in Majesty (1935-1937)
- Guildford Cathedral, Surrey
  - Rose window - Gifts of the Holy Spirit (1939-1952)
- St Columba's Church, Pont Street, Knightsbridge, London
  - Rose window - Nativity of Jesus (1955)
  - Memorial chapel window - Ceremonial sword (1956)
- Eton College Chapel, Eton, Berkshire
  - Eight armourial windows (1955-1959)
- Church of the Holy Family RC, Heath End, Farnham, Surrey
  - Complete glazing scheme of 14 windows (1960-1976)
- Norwich Cathedral, Norfolk
  - Bauchun Chapel - Benedictine Window (1964)
