= St Joseph's Church, Burslem =

Church of St Joseph
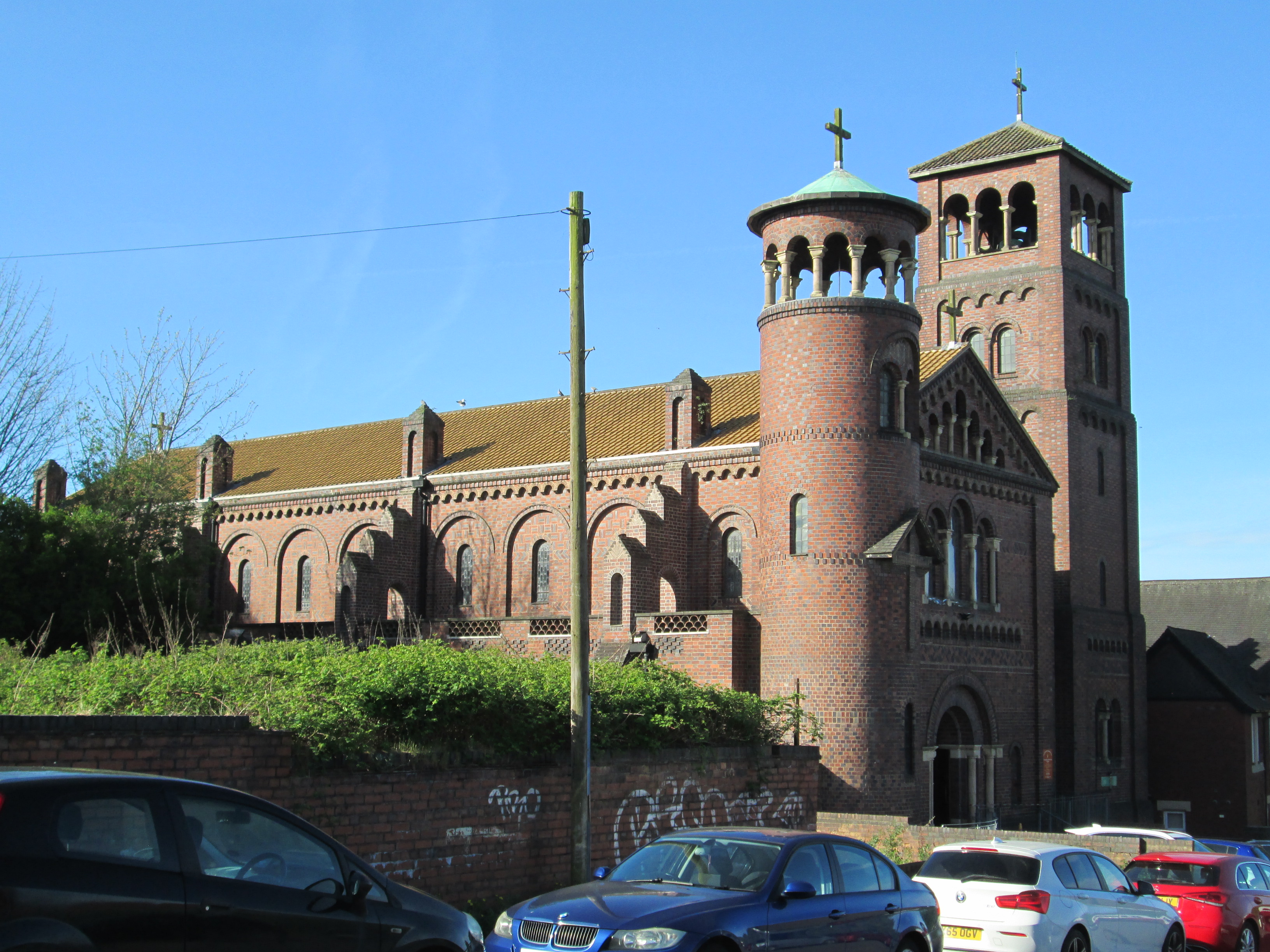
- Church of St Joseph
- 53°2′43.188″N 2°12′5.339″W
- OS grid reference: SJ 86589 49803
- Location: Burslem, Stoke-on-Trent
- Country: England
- Denomination: Roman Catholic
- Website: www.birminghamdiocese.org.uk/st-joseph-burslem

History
- Consecrated: June 1937

Architecture
- Heritage designation: Grade II* listed
- Designated: 15 March 1993
- Architect: John Sydney Brocklesby
- Completed: 1927

Administration
- Diocese: Archdiocese of Birmingham

St Joseph's Church is a Roman Catholic church in Hall Street in Burslem, Stoke-on-Trent, England, and in the Archdiocese of Birmingham. The building, completed in 1927, is Grade II* listed. The interior includes decorations by Gordon Forsyth and his daughter Moira Forsyth.

== History ==
A building for Roman Catholics was erected in Hall Street in 1898, which had a church dedicated to St Joseph on the upper floor and a school below. A presbytery was built in the same street in 1903, adjoining the site on which the present church was built, after fundraising during the early 1920s, in 1925–1927. It was designed in Romanesque style by John Sydney Brocklesby, who was also the architect of the Church of the Sacred Heart in Tunstall. Work continued on embellishing the church for about ten years, and it was consecrated in June 1937.

== Description ==
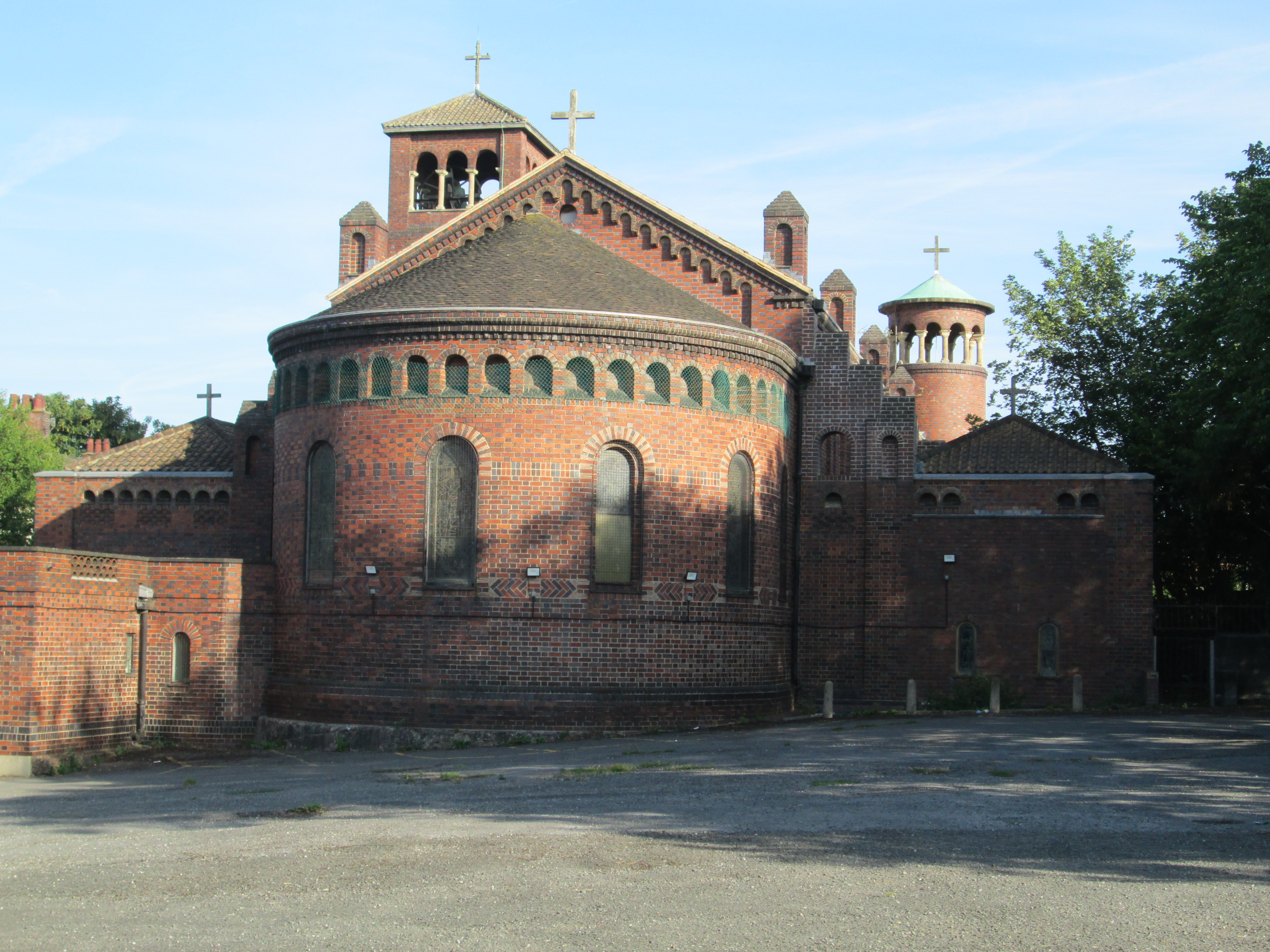
The apse at the liturgical east end

It is built of red and purple bricks. In the north-west corner there is a campanile with four stages of slightly diminishing height, each decorated with blank arcading, and an open arcade on the upper stage. There is a round tower, lower than the campanile, in the north-east corner, with an open arcade on the upper stage. Between the campanile and tower, the side facing Hall Street is gabled and has a wide-arched central doorway with stone columns; there are three windows above, with similar arches and columns.

=== Interior ===
Inside, there is a nave and lower aisles, and an apsidal chancel. The nave has three bays divided by brick pilasters, each subdivided into three by columns and arches. There is a flat coffered ceiling. The marble pulpit is inlaid with mosaic tiles from Italy. There is a marble reredos decorated with pink and green marble columns and panels.

Decorations were designed by Gordon Forsyth, director of Burslem School of Art. Following the suggestion by the MP for Burslem Andrew MacLaren to the parish priest William Browne, that young parishioners should make decorations, Gordon Forsyth taught them to make to his design the 32 stained glass windows, and the ceiling panels that depict the coats of arms of the Pope and the Bishop of Birmingham.

Gordon Forsyth's daughter Moira Forsyth created the painting "Christ in Glory" for the ceiling of the chancel, produced in panels in her London studio in 1935–1937. She made other artworks for the church, remaining involved with the church until William Browne's death in the 1950s.
