= Glyn Colledge =

English designer of pottery

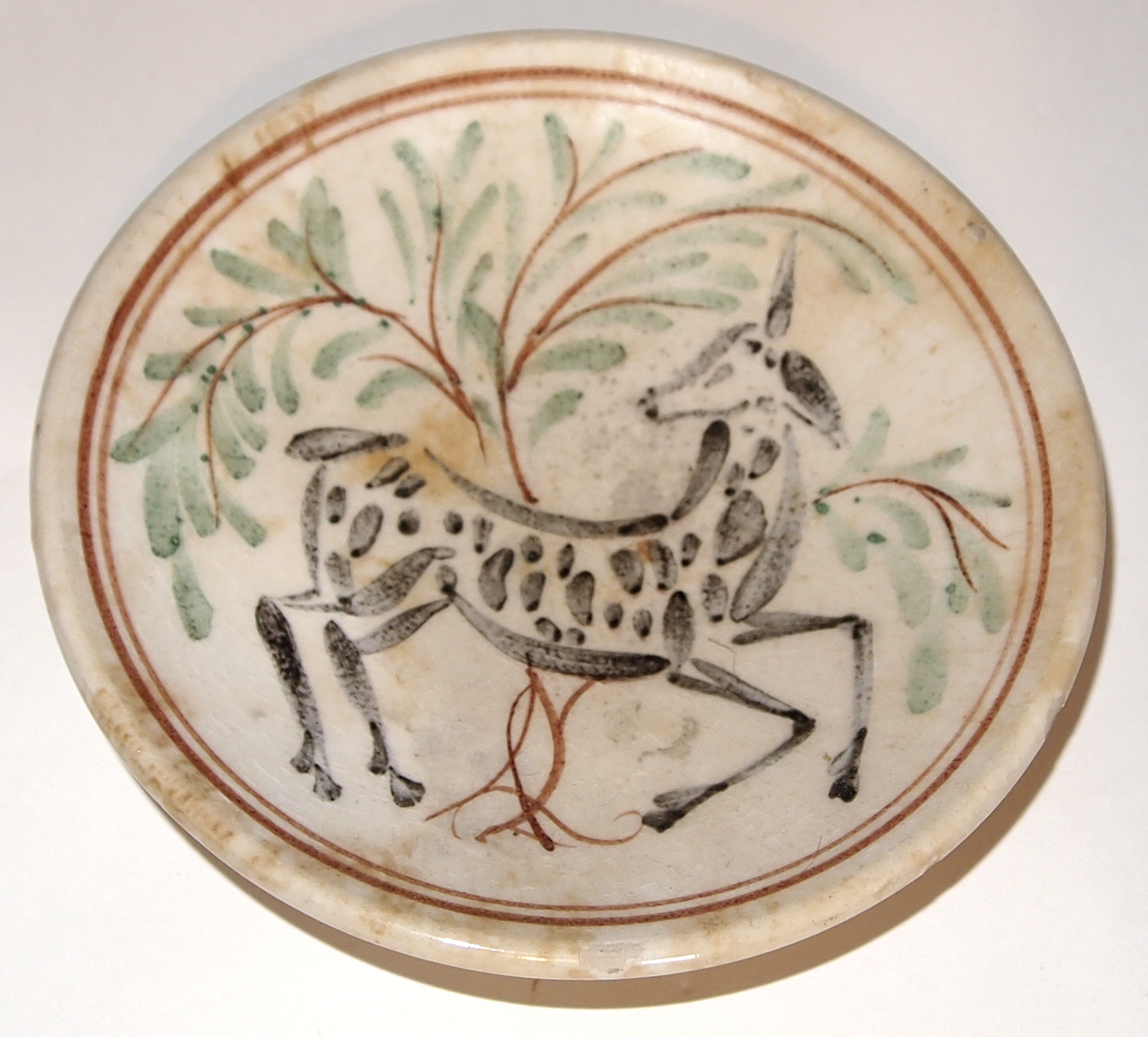
Bowl by Glyn Colledge

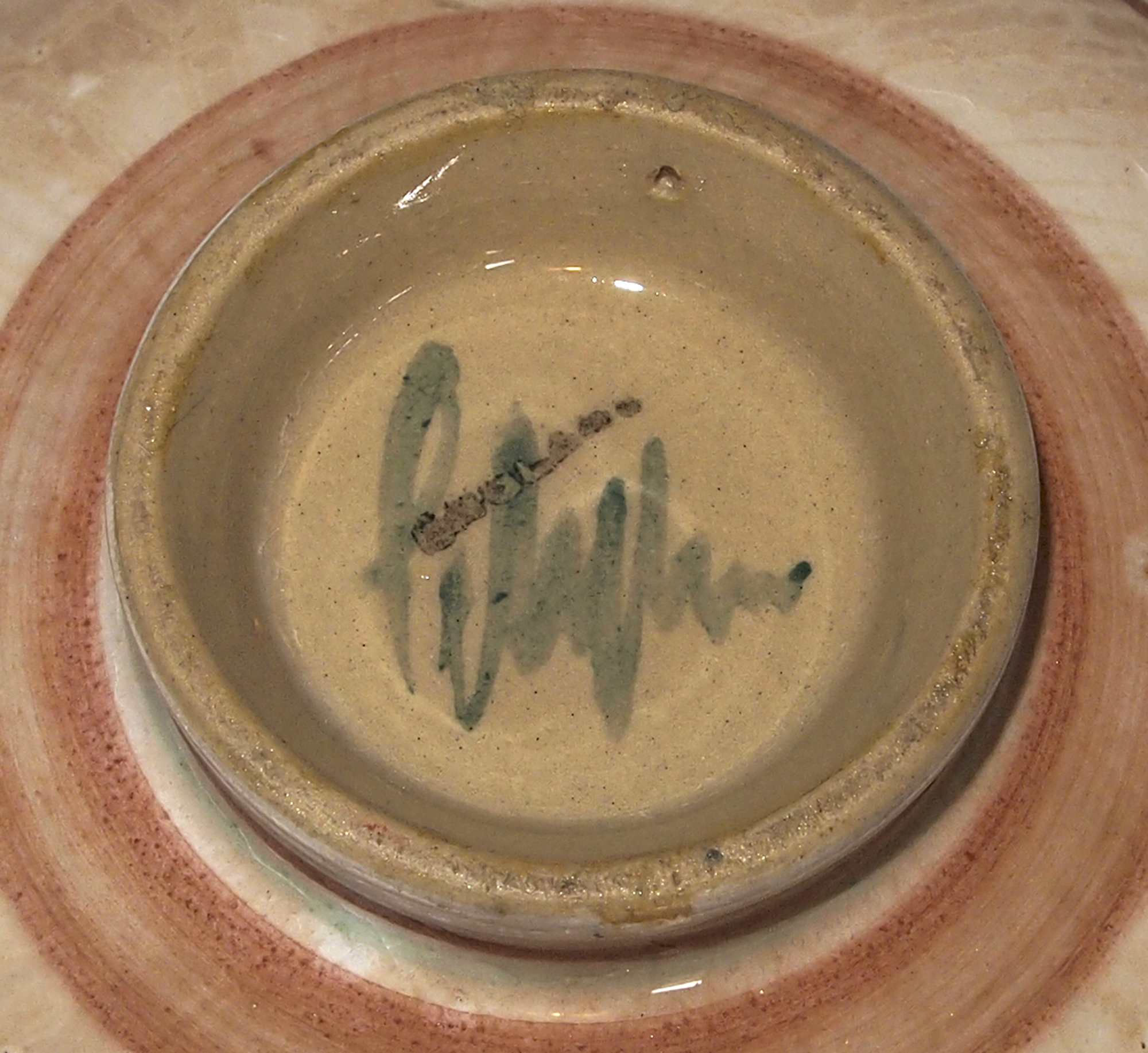
Signature of Glyn Colledge

Glyn Colledge (1922–2000) was an English designer of pottery. Colledge began working for the Denby Pottery Company in July 1938, studying at the Burslem School of Art under Gordon Forsyth at the same time. He served in the RAF Sea Rescue Service during the Second World War. Afterwards Colledge returned to Denby as a trainee designer, tutored by his father Albert Colledge, who was the design director at the pottery. He was a part-time student in the ceramics department of Derby College of Art from 1946 to 1956, becoming later a part-time lecturer there and at Ilkeston College of Further Education. At the pottery Colledge was given the studio formerly used by the Austrian designer Alice Teichtner. Here he created "Glyn Ware", characterised by designs of trailing leaves. To avoid the high rate of purchase tax on decorative pottery the ware was given functional descriptions, and each piece was signed by Colledge so that it would be classed as studio pottery.

Colledge took early retirement from Denby in 1983.

== Bibliography ==
- Hopwood, Irene; Hopwood, Gordon (1997). Denby Pottery 1809-1997:Dynasties and Designers. Richard Dennis. ISBN 0-903685-52-3.
