= Burslem Market Hall =

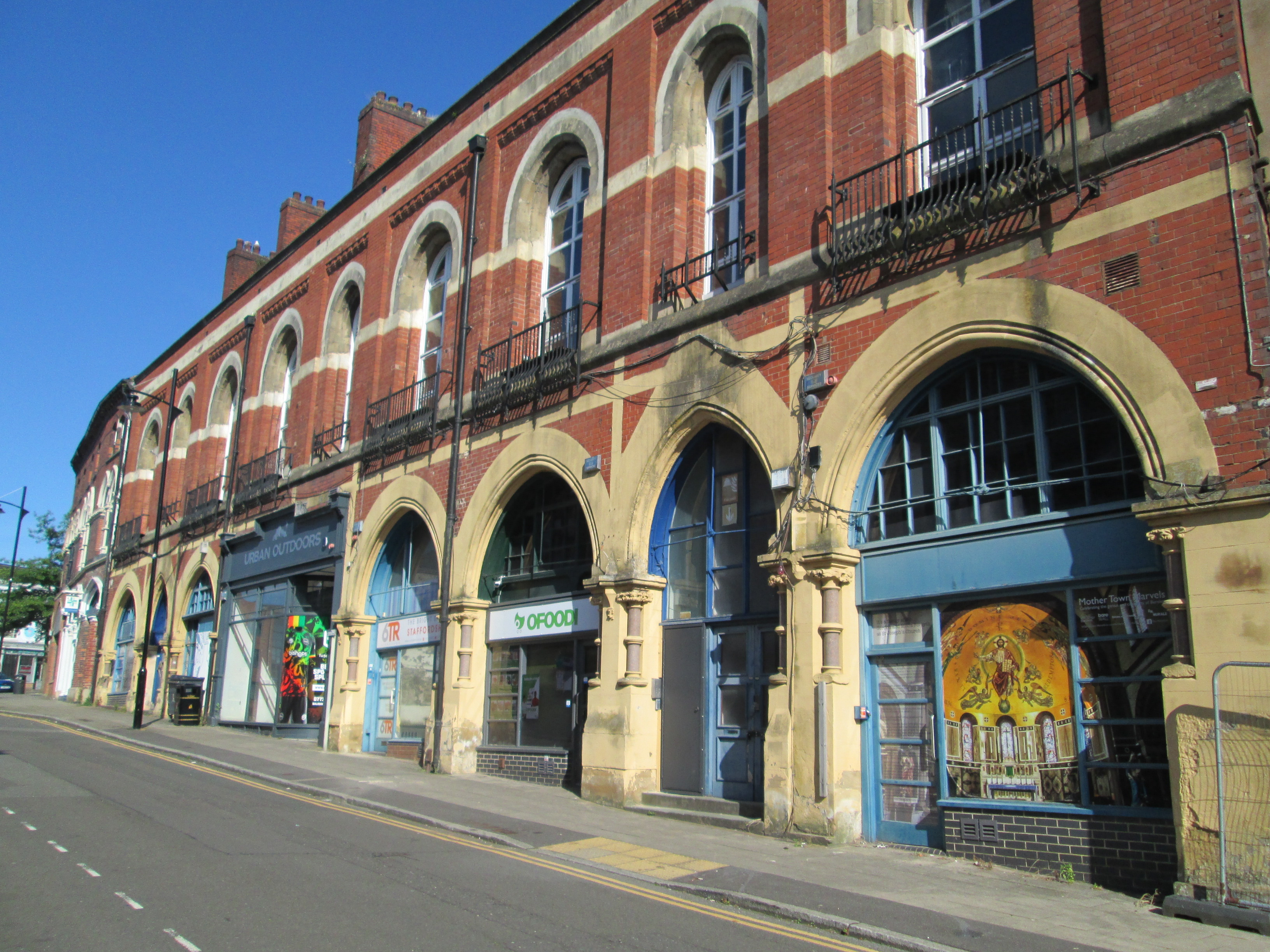
- The frontage on Queen Street

- Shown in Staffordshire
- 53°2′41.53″N 2°11′53.75″W
- Location: Burslem
- OS grid reference: SJ 86805 49752

History
- Built: 1878–1879

Listed Building – Grade II
- Designated: 12 December 2022
- Reference no.: 1483420

Burslem Market Hall, built in 1879, is a listed building in the centre of Burslem, in Stoke-on-Trent, England. The former market hall was closed in 2003.

== History ==
The first covered market, a stone single-storey building in Classical style, was erected in 1835 on ground east of the town hall; it was demolished in 1953.

Loans were approved by Burslem's Local Government Board in 1877, for a new market hall including shops on the Queen Street frontage with offices above. It was designed by E. M. Richards, the Burslem Board Engineer and Surveyor. The hall was opened on 14 August 1879 by Thomas Hulme, Mayor of Burslem.

The market hall closed in 2003, after masonry fell from the ceiling. The Victorian Society in 2021, commenting that it is in need of vital repairs, placed it among its top 10 endangered buildings. The Society described the building: "The market tells the story of Burslem’s rise and subsequent decline, with its ghost signs and fading advertisements from the Victorian era...."

It was given Grade II listed status on 12 December 2022.

=== Restoration ===
In August 2025, Burslem Market Hall was awarded a grant of £1 million by Historic England, to fund urgent repairs to make the building safe and watertight, as a step towards eventually bringing it back into use, as a venue for community events, exhibitions or local gatherings. The grant was one of 37 given to projects by the Heritage at Risk Capital Fund, a special 1-year, £15 million fund. The grant was withdrawn in January 2026: the project was originally intended to be completed within a year, but Historic England had concerns about the high cost of materials that would be incurred before work started, and about likely delays before work would start. Instead, Historic England offered a development grant of up to £200,000, to support the next stage of planning and feasibility work.

It was announced in April 2026 that work to restore the market hall would begin that month, and was expected to be completed by May 2027. The work, worth £4 million, would be funded by Stoke-on-Trent City Council, the government and Historic England.

In October 2026, Historic England announced that £1 million had been awarded to support the project for the restoration and re-use of the market hall. It was one of 74 projects awarded funding totalling over £41 million.

== Description ==
The hall lies between the market place to the north and Queen Street to the south. The frontage on Queen Street (a short distance west of the Grade II* listed Wedgwood Institute), is in red brick with stone dressings, in Gothic style: on the upper floor there are nine bays with arch windows, and on the ground floor a central shop front occupies two bays, other bays having broad stone arches enclosing single business premises.

There are entrance passages to the hall from Keates Street to the east, from Market Passage to the north, and two from Queen Street. Inside the hall, there are stalls in pairs under large arches, some retaining shop signs, lining the east and west sides. On the north wall, there are six-pointed arch recessed panels: in the third arch, an inscribed stone records the opening of the hall in 1879. The hall has a glazed iron roof which used the patented system of W. E. Rendle (1820–1881).
