= Skellern =

Skellern is a surname. Notable people with the surname include:

- Anna Skellern (born 1985), Australian actress
- David James Skellern (born 1951), Australian engineer and computer scientist
- Eileen Skellern (1923–1980), English psychiatric nurse
- Peter Skellern (1947–2017), English singer-songwriter and pianist
- Victor Skellern (1909–1966), British ceramics designer
