= Francis Hamilton Wedgwood =

Francis Hamilton Wedgwood JP DL
- Born: Francis Hamilton Wedgwood; 9 October 1867
- Died: 29 October 1930 (aged 63)
- Education: Clifton College, Trinity College, Cambridge, Cambridge University
- Spouse: Katherine Gwendoline Pigott
- Children: 3, including Cecily Wedgwood
- Parent(s): Clement Wedgwood; Emily Catherine Rendel

Francis Hamilton Wedgwood JP DL (9 October 1867 – 29 October 1930) was a partner in and Managing Director of the Wedgwood pottery firm.

== Biography ==
Wedgwood was the eldest son of Clement Wedgwood and Emily Catherine Rendel, daughter of the engineer James Meadows Rendel. He was the great-great-grandson of the potter Josiah Wedgwood. His younger brothers were Sir Ralph Wedgwood and Josiah Wedgwood, 1st Baron Wedgwood. He was educated at Clifton College and Trinity College, Cambridge.

He was commissioned a captain in the 4th (Militia) Battalion North Staffordshire Regiment on 2 July 1894. The battalion was embodied after the outbreak of the Second Boer War in late 1899, and he left Queenstown for South Africa on the SS Kildonan Castle with other men of the battalion in March 1900. He served in South Africa until the end of the war, returning home with his battalion in June 1902. During the First World War he also served as a recruiting officer.

He became managing director of Wedgwood in 1916 when his cousin Cecil Wedgwood was killed at the Battle of the Somme. He was also a director of the LMS Railway. He was High Sheriff of Staffordshire for 1929–30.

Wedgwood married Katherine Gwendoline Pigott, daughter of the Rev. Edmund Vincent Pigott, of Doddershall Park, on 11 September 1902 in Trentham and they had three children:

- Frances Dorothea Joy Wedgwood (1903–1996)
- Cecily Stella Wedgwood (1905–1995), artist for Wedgwood
- Clement Tom Wedgwood (1907–1960)

He died suddenly in 1930 in Euston, London and was buried at Barlaston; his nephew Josiah Wedgwood V became the managing director of Wedgwood.
