= Doris Boulton-Maude =

British artist (1892-1961)

- Born: Doris Boulton; 1892
- Died: 1961 (aged 68–69)
- Education: Burslem School of Art; Royal College of Art; Slade School of Art
- Known for: Painting, printmaking

Doris Boulton later Doris Boulton-Maude, (1892–1961) was a British artist, notable as a wood engraver, etcher and for her colour woodcut prints.

== Bıography ==
Boulton-Maude studied at the Burslem School of Art in Stoke on Trent before attending the Royal College of Art, RCA, in London from 1916 to 1921. While at the RCA she had a number of works shown at the Royal Academy and was elected a member of the Royal Society of Painter-Etchers and Engravers in 1918. From 1924 to 1931 Boulton-Maude lived in Egypt during which time she worked as an artist on the Pennsylvania Archaeological Expedition to Palestine. When she returned to England she briefly enrolled at the Slade School of Art in London and resumed her exhibıtıng career. Her prints of Egypt and Palestine were shown at the Society of Wood Engravings annual exhibitions from 1934 to 1936. From 1933 to 1938 she exhibited a number of scenes of the north-east of England with the Society of Graver Painters in Colour. In 1937 she married Lionel Maude and began exhibiting as Doris Boulton-Maude rather than Doris Boulton as previously. She had works shown at the Walker Art Gallery in Liverpool, at the New English Art Club, with the Society of Women Artists and with the Royal Society of British Artists. For many years she lived at Great Baddow ın Essex and ın 1995 the Chelmsford Museums Servıce organised a touring exhibıtıon of her work. Both the British Museum and the National Gallery of Victoria hold examples of her prints.
