= Barlaston and Rough Close Common =

Nature reserve in Staffordshire, England

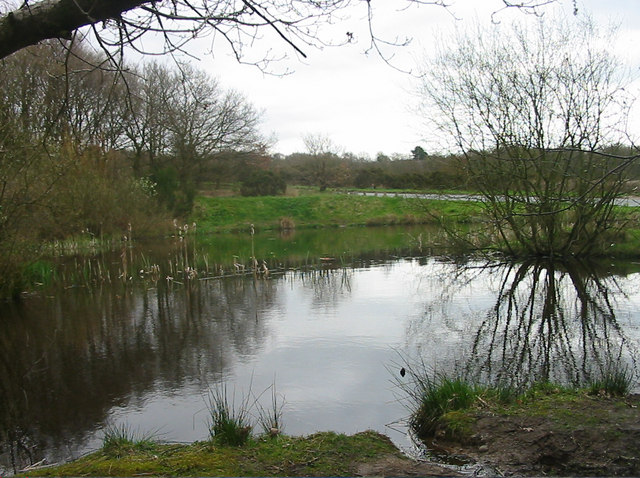
- The pool on the northern edge of the common

- Location within Staffordshire
- Interactive map of Barlaston and Rough Close Common
- Location: near Barlaston, Staffordshire
- OS grid: SJ 923 396
- Coordinates: 52°57′15″N 2°6′56″W
- Area: 20.6 hectares (51 acres)
- Operator: Stafford Borough Council
- Designation: Local nature reserve
- Website: www.staffordbc.gov.uk/barlaston-and-rough-close-common

Barlaston and Rough Close Common is a local nature reserve, an area of heathland in Staffordshire, England, near Barlaston and about 3 miles (4.8 km) north of Stone.

== Description ==
The reserve covers an area of 20.6 hectares (51 acres). It is owned and managed by Stafford Borough Council. It was declared a local nature reserve (LNR) in 2000.

There are two areas of lowland heath, divided by a minor road running north–south through the site. The western area, which comprises most of the reserve, is mainly marshy grassland, and purple moor grass and soft-rush grows here; there is a pool at the northern edge. The eastern area is dry grassland with heather such as bell heather and bilberry.

The wet heath is managed, to prevent it becoming scrub and eventually woodland, by means of grazing from April until autumn by Red Poll cattle. This was first done in 2008. Monitoring of the heath has indicated that the regular grazing is effective.
