= Muriel Pemberton =

British fashion designer, painter and academic

- Born: 8 September 1909; Tunstall, Staffordshire, England
- Died: 30 July 1993 (aged 83); St Leonards-on-Sea, England
- Education: Burslem School of Art; Royal College of Art
- Known for: Fashion design training, painting

Muriel Alice Pemberton RWS (8 September 1909 – 30 July 1993) was a British fashion designer, painter and academic.

According to The Independent, she "invented art-school training in fashion in Britain".

== Early life ==
Muriel Alice Pemberton was born in Tunstall, Stoke-on-Trent, on 8 September 1909, or 8 September 1910.

The daughter of Thomas Henry Pemberton, who was a skilled amateur painter as well as a photographic innovator, inventing a one-camera stereoscopic process. Her mother, Alice Pemberton, née Smith, retired from a career as a professional singer upon marriage and she was also a gifted designer and needlewoman.

At the age of fifteen, she was the youngest student at the local Burslem School of Art. In 1928, she obtained a scholarship as well as a major award to attend the School of Painting at London's Royal College of Art. In 1931, she was awarded the RCA's first ever Diploma in Fashion. Pemberton persuaded the head of the school of design, Professor Ernest William Tristram, to introduce such a course, and he asked her to draft the curriculum.

According to the ODNB,

She proposed a combination of direct contact, sketching, and analysing with an actual couturier, learning the basic skills of cutting and sewing with a professional, and supplementing this with academic studies in the history of fashion and design at museums such as the Victoria and Albert.

== Career ==
Following graduation in 1931, Pemberton was immediately employed to teach fashion drawing two days a week at St Martin's School of Art. Over time, she was able to expand this role and became head of the UK's first Faculty of Fashion and Design. The curriculum was much as she had originally proposed to Tristram.

Even before the war, Pemberton's innovative approach to teaching fashion and giving it a proper place in the art college curriculum had attracted international attention. Her methods were widely copied, with teachers visiting from all over the globe to study her approach.

Her students included Katharine Hamnett, Bruce Oldfield, Bill Gibb and Bjorn Lanberg. In 1993, John Russell Taylor published a biography of her life.

== Personal life ==
In 1941, she married John Hadley Rowe (died 1975).

Pemberton died at 56 Vale Road, St Leonards-on-Sea, Sussex, on 30 July 1993.
