= Jessie van Hallen =

British ceramicist

Jessie Elaine Hallen (née Brooke; 1902–1983), known as Jessie Van Hallen, was a British ceramicist who worked for George Wade between 1930 and 1940. Born in Wolstanton, Stoke-on-Trent, she attended Burslem School of Art. She is known for her highly collectible whimsical figurines, such as garden gnomes, flowers, animals and ladies. The onset of the Second World War curtailed production of such pieces in favour of those more in line with the war effort.

A hall at Staffordshire University is named after her.
