= Wedgwood Institute =

Building in Burslem, Stoke-on-Trent, Staffordshire, England

Coordinates: 53.0448°N 2.1973°W

The Wedgwood Institute is a large red-brick building that stands in Queen Street, in the town of Burslem, Stoke-on-Trent, Staffordshire, England. It is sometimes called the Wedgwood Memorial Institute, but it is not to be confused with the former Wedgwood Memorial College in Barlaston. It achieved listed building status (Grade II*) in 1972.

Wedgwood Institute, photographed in May 2011

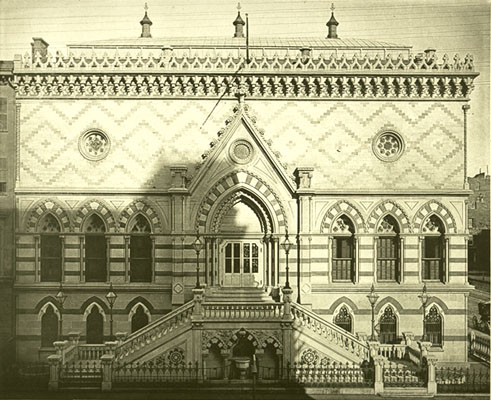
National Academy of Design, New York (1863–65). Built in the same decade as the Wedgwood Institute, it was another example of a Gothic Revival building modelled on the Doge's Palace

== Construction and opening ==
The Wedgwood Institute was funded entirely by public subscription from 1859 onward, the estimated cost at the time being £4,000, and was constructed between 1863 and 1869. It was named after the potter Josiah Wedgwood, and it stands on the site of the former Brick House pottery works which Wedgwood had rented from 1762 to 1770. Brick House was the second of his pottery works in the town of Burslem, the first being at the Ivy House works. A small part of the old works was incorporated into the fabric of the new Institute.

The foundation stone of the new institute was laid by then Chancellor of the Exchequer William Ewart Gladstone on 26 October 1863; the building itself opened 21 April 1869.

The School of Art and Science opened in October 1869; the Free Library opened in 1870; their cost being by the levy of a penny rate (i.e.: a local universal property tax) under the Public Libraries Act 1850.

== Decorative scheme ==
The style of architecture chosen was Venetian Gothic, which had been popularised by John Ruskin. The basic design is by an architect called Nichols, but the elaborate decorations which form an integral part of the facade were designed by Robert Edgar and John Lockwood Kipling. Kipling, the father of the famous writer Rudyard Kipling, emigrated to India in 1865 while the building was still under construction, and the façade was not completed until 1871.

It is an ornate building coated with numerous inlaid sculptures, ceramics and a series of zodiac mosaics, the latter executed by Signor Salviati. Over the entrance is a tympanum with portrait medallions of three people connected with Wedgwood's projects: these are John Flaxman, the sculptor, Joseph Priestley, the scientist and discoverer of oxygen, and Thomas Bentley (1730–1780), a business partner of Wedgwood. Above the tympanum is a statue of Josiah Wedgwood. The statue is in the middle of a frieze.

Around the upper storey is set a series of twelve terracotta panels to illustrate the months of the year, and above them mosaics of the corresponding signs of the zodiac. Around the middle of the building are ten terracotta panels depicting processes involved in the manufacture of pottery. The cresting at the top of the facade recalls the Doge's Palace.

== Later history of the institute ==
The art students remained in the institute until 1905 when Burslem School of Art was provided with its own building directly opposite the institute. The local public lending library in the institute moved across the road to the Burslem School of Art in 2008 and then was closed by the council about 18 months later.

The institute was at one time as an annexe for Staffordshire University and more latterly for Stoke-on-Trent College. In 2009 it was used for an exhibition and lectures.

== Conservation of the building ==
It has been unoccupied since 2008. In recent years it became derelict and was placed on Historic England's Heritage at Risk Register, assessed to be in poor condition and slowly decaying.

In February 2015, work began to restore the building, using grant money, carried out by Stoke-on-Trent City Council and The Prince's Regeneration Trust (now the King's Foundation). The Prince's Regeneration Trust would offer it to start-up businesses.

In March 2024, funding was awarded from Historic England, to make the building weather-tight and safe to access. Louise Brennan, Midlands regional director at Historic England, said finding a new use for it was taking time but it could not continue to deteriorate. The planning application for the work stated that ".... The intention is to safeguard the structure, recognising the significance of the building and its interior and prevent further deterioration in anticipation of a future refurbishment."

There was a planned and controlled demolition of a section of gable wall of the building in September 2025, as part of remedial work. A spokesperson for the City Council said: "This work is part of an operation to make the Grade II*-listed building structurally safe ahead of longer term heritage works to regenerate it.... No other part of the building has been affected or damaged by this procedure." It was reported in January 2026 that essential work on the north-east corner of the building, taking about six weeks, would start that month, as part of wider safeguarding and improvement of the structure.

== People associated with the institute ==
The building has played its part in the lives of many famous local people such as the scientist Oliver Lodge, the writer Arnold Bennett and potters such as Frederick Hurten Rhead and William Moorcroft.
