= The Clayhanger Family =

Novel series by Arnold Bennett, 1910–1918

The Clayhanger Family Series
- Cover of Penguin Modern Classics edition of Clayhanger
- Author: Arnold Bennett
- Language: English
- Series: The Clayhanger Family
- Subject: Coming of age
- Genre: novel
- Publisher: Egmont Books (1st edition)
- Publication date: 1910, 1911, 1916, & 1918
- Publication place: United Kingdom
- ISBN: 978-0-416-20540-4

The Clayhanger Family is a series of novels by Arnold Bennett, published between 1910 and 1918. Though the series is commonly referred to as a "trilogy", and the first three novels were published in a single volume, as The Clayhanger Family, in 1925, there are actually four books. All four are set in the "Five Towns", Bennett's thinly disguised version of the six towns of the Staffordshire Potteries.

== Novels ==
=== Clayhanger (1910) ===
This coming-of-age story set in the Midlands of Victorian England follows Edwin Clayhanger as he leaves school, takes over the family business and falls in love. Edwin Clayhanger's father, Darius, has risen from an extremely poor background, which Bennett repeatedly returns to, to become a prominent printer in Bursley, one of Bennett's "Five Towns" – his fictionalised version of the six towns of the Staffordshire Potteries. Edwin is not aware of his father's history and takes his family's affluence for granted. He allows his ambition to become an architect to be overruled by his father and instead becomes an office junior in his father's business. He sees through the many hypocrisies of Victorian England, but he does not confront them or become his own man until after his father's final illness and death. Then he reopens his relationship with the impoverished but exotic Hilda Lessways.

=== Hilda Lessways (1911) ===
The second novel in the series parallels Edwin Clayhanger's story from the point of view of his eventual wife, Hilda, telling the story of her coming of age, her working experiences as a shorthand clerk and as a keeper of lodging houses in London and Brighton, her relationship with George Cannon, which ends in her disastrous bigamous marriage and pregnancy, and her reconciliation with Edwin Clayhanger. Bennett includes some scenes from the first book retold from Hilda's perspective. Writing for The Smart Set, H. L. Mencken speculated that this device of retelling the same events through another character's eyes "so far as I know, is original with Mr. Bennett. The world is filled with sequels, but such a parallel sequel is a novelty."

=== These Twain (1915) ===
The third novel in the series was published in serial form in Munsey's Magazine in October and November 1915, and published in a single volume in New York in the same year and in London in 1916. It chronicles the married life of Edwin and Hilda. Edwin, released from the controlling influence of his father, finds himself free to run his business and his life, but his freedom is diminished by his wife's caprices. Hilda does not conform to the expected role of submissive wife, which is partly why Edwin married her, and has opinions on matters, such as Edwin's business, that in their day are regarded as for men only. Edwin has his doubts about their marriage and is brought to mostly impotent anger by his wife just as he had been by his father.

=== The Roll-Call (1918) ===
The fourth novel in the series concerns the early life of Edwin Clayhanger's stepson, George, who insists on remaining George Cannon and refuses to take his stepfather's name. George is an architect and thus represents what Edwin Clayhanger once wanted to be. (Edwin, now an alderman of Bursley, appears only briefly in this novel.) Unlike his mother and stepfather, George has not experienced poverty and has been spoiled by having too easy a life (a theme that Bennett had previously explored with other characters in The Old Wives' Tale).

== Reception ==
The Oxford Companion to Twentieth-Century Literature in English says of Clayhanger, "The provincial Methodist background, Darius's penniless childhood and his rescue from the workhouse, and the growing prosperity and cultural aspirations of the family are described in sharply observed cumulative detail. The novel provides a wealth of accurate documentation about the manners and industry of the region". The Oxford Companion to Edwardian Fiction comments, "After the critical and commercial success of The Old Wives' Tale (1908), Clayhanger set the seal on Bennett's reputation as the laureate of the commonplace". The article adds that the conflict between father and son "is also a conflict between eras: between Victorian thrift and (somewhat tentative) Edwardian pleasures".

The Oxford Companion to Edwardian Fiction says of Hilda Lessways, "On the whole, reviewers admired Bennett's ability to describe from a woman's point of view events he had described from a man's point of view in Clayhanger (1910)". The Manchester Guardian said, "It is almost incredible that two novels which have so much material in common should nevertheless possess such an absolute individuality that the effect of reading one is an immediate desire to refer to the other for new light on the situations described by both". The Observer called it "a meticulous analysis of a woman's life, but it is more scientific than passionate".

The Observer thought These Twain "an unsatisfactory conclusion to the Clayhanger trilogy. It lacks the unity of the first two volumes. Incidents are haphazard, and there is a suspicion of spinning out the stuff to make a volume". The English Review said, "It is all very interesting, deftly spun, accurately observed; it is certainly life, and presented without trickery or nonsense, yet we must express the hope that there won't be a sequel".

The Roll Call was generally felt to be inferior to the first three books. In her 1974 study of Bennett, Margaret Drabble finds that although the book "has one or two good things in it" it is "not very successful: there is something peculiarly dispiriting about the whole novel, which is hard to analyse". The Oxford Companion to Edwardian Fiction calls it "somewhat inferior" to the other three Clayhanger books.

== Clayhanger Street, Burslem ==
Clayhanger Street in Burslem was named after the first novel in the series. It runs beside the Wedgwood Institute.

== TV versions ==
Hilda Lessways, a television drama series, was transmitted by the BBC in 1959, with Judi Dench as Hilda. The first three novels were dramatised as a 26-part serial by ATV and broadcast on the British network ITV in 1976. The cast includes Janet Suzman as Hilda Lessways, Peter McEnery as Edwin Clayhanger, Harry Andrews as Darius Clayhanger, Bruce Purchase as Big James and Denholm Elliott as Tertius Ingpen. The serial was released on DVD in 2010.

== Sources ==
- Drabble, Margaret (1974). Arnold Bennett. London: Weidenfeld and Nicolson. ISBN 978-0-297-76733-6.
- Watson, George; Ian R. Willison (1972). The New Cambridge Bibliography of English Literature, Volume 4. Cambridge: Cambridge University Press. ISBN 978-0-521-08535-9.
