= Sidney Tushingham =

English painter

Sidney Tushingham (1884–1968) was a painter and etcher who specialised in rustic scenes of villages and small-town life.

He was born in Burslem, Stoke-on-Trent, England, where he started his artistic career as a china painter. He attended Burslem School of Art and progressed to the Royal College of Art. He worked as a vase painter at Royal Doulton in 1922 as he established his career as a society painter. He also became known for his etchings of pre-war Britain, Italy and Spain, and was a member of the Society of Graphic Art, where he exhibited in 1921.

He died in Haywards Heath, West Sussex in 1968.
