= William Bowyer (artist) =

British painter (1926–2015)

Anchored at Blackshore by William Bowyer

William Bowyer RA (25 May 1926 – 1 March 2015) was a British portrait and landscape painter, who worked in a traditional manner.

== Life and work ==
William Bowyer was born in Leek, Staffordshire. He studied at Burslem School of Art and the Royal College of Art, London, where his tutors included Ruskin Spear and Carel Weight.

In 1963, he won the City of London Art Award. From 1971 until 1982, he was Head of Fine Art at Maidstone College of Art. In 1988, the National Portrait Gallery acquired his portraits of miners' leader Arthur Scargill and cricketer Viv Richards. The same year the Marylebone Cricket Club commissioned him to paint the bicentenary game at Lord's Cricket Ground.

Although a regular exhibitor in club and group shows, and the Royal Academy Summer Exhibition, his first London solo show was not until 1983, when a retrospective was held at Messum's gallery.

His work is "modern traditional" figurative painting. Strong influences come from predecessors such as John Constable and J. M. W. Turner. Landscapes concentrate on the River Thames and the Suffolk coast. His love of cricket also leads to subject matter.

Artist Ken Howard said of Bowyer's work:

The content of his pictures is the artist’s life, whether it be his beloved river at Hammersmith, Walberswick in Suffolk – where he escapes whenever possible – his friends and family, as seen in his strong and challenging portraits, or his life-long love of cricket. Bill Bowyer’s work communicates with us directly. It gives us a way of seeing the world and above all it is life enhancing.

He was elected an Associate of the Royal Academy of Arts (ARA) in 1973 and a Royal Academician (RA) in 1981. His memberships include the Royal Institute of Painters in Water Colours and the Royal Society of Portrait Painters. He was Honoured Secretary (President) of the New English Art Club for 30 years.

His work is in collections including the Royal Academy of Arts, the Arts Council of Great Britain, Vancouver Art Gallery in Canada, at Huffman and Boyle in New Jersey, at the Museum at Lord's Cricket Ground, and in Charles, Prince of Wales' private collection.

He was the father of artists, Jason Bowyer and Francis Bowyer. He lived in London and Walberswick, Suffolk.

Bowyer died in March 2015.

== See also ==
- Federation of British Artists
- Landscape art
