= Stoke-on-Trent College of Art =

Former art school in England

Coordinates: 53.002°N 2.187°W

The Stoke-on-Trent Regional College of Art was one of three colleges that were merged in 1971 to form North Staffordshire Polytechnic (later renamed Staffordshire Polytechnic and now Staffordshire University). The College of Art achieved Regional Art College status after the Second World War, but its roots lay in the nineteenth century as it was formed from three of the Potteries’ art schools.

Although the six towns which make up Stoke-on-Trent were a relatively small conurbation, each had its own art school: those at Fenton, Hanley and Tunstall had closed by the time the Regional College of Art was created, leaving Burslem, Longton and Stoke.

== Burslem ==
Burslem School of Art was perhaps the best known art school in the Potteries. It was provided with a fine building in 1905. Burslem continued to be the home of the Department of Fine Art for some years after the formation of North Staffordshire Polytechnic. Staff at Burslem included Arthur Berry who taught at the Polytechnic until 1985 by which time Fine Art had moved to College Road.

== Longton ==
The Departments of Ceramics and Fashion and Textiles were housed in the Sutherland Institute, Longton. In 1962 the Advanced Diploma in Art & Design (Ceramics) was offered by the Stoke-on-Trent Regional College of Art. Later, with the merger of the National Council for Diplomas in Art & Design and the Council for National Academic Awards, this was to become the first MA (Master of Arts) postgraduate course in North Staffordshire Polytechnic. After the formation of the North Staffordshire Polytechnic, Colin Melbourne, the sculptor and ceramic designer, who was Head of Ceramic Design at Longton became Head of Fine Arts in the new institution.

== Stoke ==
The Stoke College of Art was housed in the Herbert Minton Building in London Road from the mid-1850s. Amongst the artists who were educated in the Stoke School was Arnold Machin the sculptor, who designed the portrait of the Queen which has appeared on postage stamps since 1967 (the Machin series). In 1964 Graphic Design & Printing relocated to the Technical College site in Stoke (the present Staffordshire University College Road campus). Printing education was a key feature of the Stoke School and many advances in ceramic transfer printing (particularly in offset lithography) were first developed there by the Deardens (father and son) before their wider adoption by the ceramics industry.

== Developments in art education at North Staffordshire Polytechnic ==
In 1973 the departments of Graphic Design and Three-Dimensional Design (the latter being the renamed Department of Ceramics) combined their resources to offer a new and unique course in Multidisciplinary Design. This concept of multidisciplinary design echoed much of the philosophy of the Bauhaus of the 1920s and 1930s. Students were able to choose from a range of design subject areas and to combine them in solving design problems often located in the local community. The design disciplines available then were: typography; illustration, scientific & medical illustration; photography; audio-visual communication; textiles; industrial ceramics; ceramic sculpture; glass; silverware & jewellery; and product design.

In the early 1970s, the Department of the History of Art & Design and Complementary Studies was established. Again this was forward-looking in establishing the study of the history of art and design as an academic discipline in its own right.

In the early seventies research into letterform design for cathode ray tubes was carried out in collaboration with International Computers Limited (ICL) in Kidsgrove by staff and students in the Department of Graphic Design, North Staffordshire Polytechnic. In the same period collaborative research into computer-assisted typesetting was carried out with The Monotype Corporation.

By the end of the 1970s both design departments (Graphic Design and Three-Dimensional Design) were actively involved in many aspects of information technology and computing applied to design. In this particular application of computers, the departments were pioneers and among the first in the country. In 1982 the Department of Trade and Industry sponsored an exhibition (IT82) outlining the advantages of computing and information technology for industry. The design departments were successful in persuading the DTI to locate this travelling exhibition on the College Road campus – the only visit for the north Midlands. The pioneering in the applications of computing to Design was to lead to the development of the first BTEC course in Multimedia Design. In conjunction with the Department of Computing, the first degree course in Interactive Systems Design in the United Kingdom was developed.

In the 1980s the design departments became involved in research for the computer-aided design of ceramic shapes using solid modelling techniques, and surface pattern designs using advanced computer graphics. The experience gained in this area was to be used in the early planning of the Hothouse Design Centre located in Longton.
