= Gordon Forsyth =

Scottish ceramic designer, fine artist and art education innovator

Gordon Mitchell Forsyth (1879–1952) was a Scottish ceramic designer and fine artist and art education innovator.

== Biography ==
Born in Fraserburgh, he attended the Gray's School of Art, in Aberdeen and the Royal College of Art. Moving in 1903 to Stoke-on-Trent, he became art director of the tileworks Minton Hollins & Co, where he began a career which "spanned over forty years and left an indelible mark on the ceramic industry of Staffordshire.". In 1906 he moved to take the same position at Pilkington's Tile & Pottery Company near Manchester. He returned to Pilkington's after service in the First World War. However, in 1920 he became Superintendent of Art Instruction in Stoke-on-Trent, a role which involved responsibility for several art schools. Forsyth was the tutor of a number of notable students at the Burslem School of Art including Susie Cooper, Glyn Colledge, Clarice Cliff, Charlotte Rhead, Arthur Berry, and Mabel Leigh. At that time, Forsyth was described as a "pottery designer, educator and writer...and one of the main spokespersons on industrial pottery design." And the pivotal role he played in British ceramic design has inspired some to call him "the magus of the mid-twentieth century pottery industry."

== Stained glass ==
Forsyth is best known for his work in ceramics, particularly lustreware. However, he did work in other media, notably stained glass: he designed stained glass windows for St Joseph's Roman Catholic church in Burslem in the late 1920s.

Forsyth's daughter Moira (1905–91), who also worked on the decoration of the church, had a successful career as a glass designer.

== Published works ==
- Gordon Mitchell Forsyth, Joseph William Mellor & H. J. Plant, Introduction to Sympsium on Art, Stoke-on-Trent: Webberley, 1921
- Gordon Mitchell Forsyth, Art in the Pottery Industry, no date
- Gordon Mitchell Forsyth, The Art and Craft of the Potter, London: Chapman & Hall, 1934
- Gordon Mitchell Forsyth, M. P. Bisson, F. Jefferson Graham, W. Hartley, Pottery, Clay Modelling, and Plaster Casting, Sir I. Pitman & Sons Ltd. (in two volumes), 1935
- Gordon Mitchell Forsyth, 20th Century Ceramics: an International Survey of the Best Work Produced by Modern Craftsmen, Artists and Manufacturers, The Studio Ltd, 1936

== See also ==
- Susie Cooper
- Burslem School of Art
- Arthur Berry
