= Star Wedgwood =

British ceramicist

Cecily Stella Wedgwood
- Born: 29 October 1904; Barlaston, Staffordshire, England
- Died: 18 February 1995 (aged 90); Oxfordshire, England
- Other name: Star Wedgwood
- Occupation: Ceramicist
- Spouse: Frederic Maitland Wright
- Parents: Francis Hamilton Wedgwood (father); Katherine Pigott (mother)

Cecily Stella Wedgwood (29 October 1904 – 18 February 1995), known as Star Wedgwood, was an English ceramicist descended from the Wedgwood family.

== Family ==
Star was born on 29 October 1904 in Barlaston, Staffordshire, England. She was the daughter of Major Francis Hamilton Wedgwood and his wife Katherine Wedgwood (née Pigott). Her father has been described as a "fifth generation Wedgwood", directly descended from the Wedgwood company founder, potter Josiah Wedgwood, thus making Star part of the Wedgwood family's sixth generation.

== Work ==
Star was introduced to pottery decoration through Alfred Powell's painting classes at the Etruria Works of the Wedgwood pottery firm in England.

She became a designer herself at the company during the early 1930s and created a number of patterns on bone china and Queen's ware for Wedgwood. Her signature was a five-pointed star and the initials CW. According to the Wedgwood Museum, "Her bone china designs tend to be bold, and made extensive use of strong colours and platinum lustre". Some of her works are held in the collection of the Victoria and Albert Museum in London.

In 1937, Star married Frederic Maitland Wright, who later became the company secretary of Wedgwood and joint managing director with Norman Wilson. She died in Oxfordshire in 1995.
