= Barlaston =

Village in Staffordshire, England

Coordinates: 52.9457°N 2.1583°W

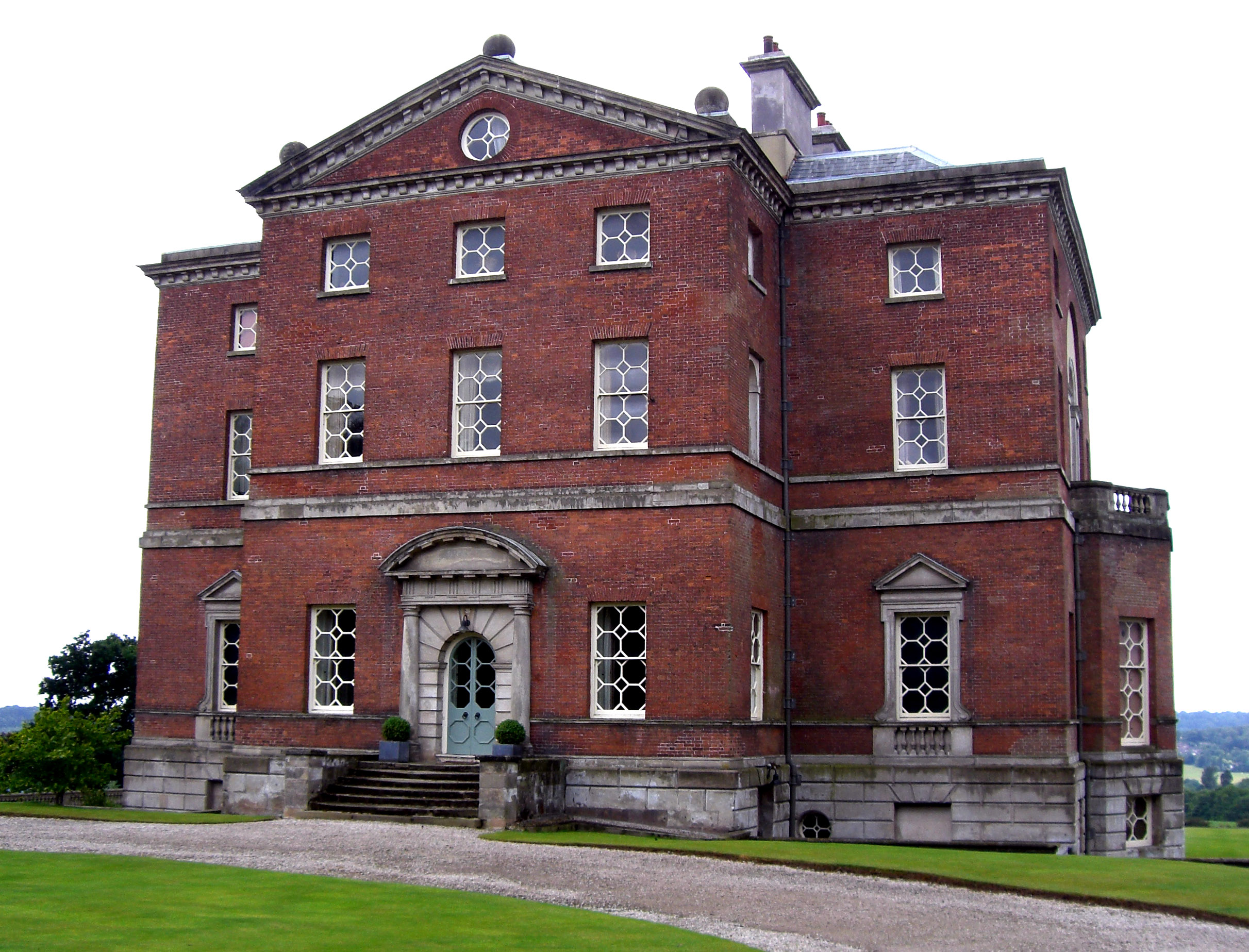
- Barlaston Hall

- Location within Staffordshire
- Population: 2,858 (2011)
- OS grid reference: SJ894387
- District: Stafford
- Shire county: Staffordshire
- Region: West Midlands
- Country: England
- Sovereign state: United Kingdom
- Post town: Stoke-on-Trent
- Postcode district: ST12
- Dialling code: 01782
- Police: Staffordshire
- Fire: Staffordshire
- Ambulance: West Midlands
- UK Parliament: Stoke-on-Trent South

Barlaston is a village and civil parish in Staffordshire, England, halfway between Stoke-on-Trent and Stone. At the 2011 census, the population was 2,858.

== History ==
=== Historic buildings ===
==== St John's Church ====
The old parish church of Saint John is sited on the edge of the Wedgwood estate. It was built to the design of Charles Lynam in 1886-8, retaining the west tower from the original medieval building, with the subsequent addition of a vestry in 1969. In 1981 the Grade II listed building had to be closed owing to mining subsidence and a temporary building next to the church took its place until the new church was built on Green Lane.

==== Barlaston Hall ====
Barlaston Hall c. 1756 by Sir Robert Taylor (architect) was at one time a Wedgwood family home. The Grade I listed Hall has been restored after damage from subsidence.

== Wedgwood ==
Wedgwood moved their pottery manufacturing business from Etruria, Staffordshire to a large modern factory in a new village in the north of the parish. The factory was planned in 1936 and built in 1938–40 to the designs of Keith Murray who was also a designer of Wedgwood pottery. The factory has a tourist visitor centre containing the Wedgwood Museum, with its own car-parks and a bus station.

Wedgwood railway station was opened for the factory in 1940 and is currently served by rail replacement bus (D&G Buses Service 14) on which all valid railway tickets and passes are accepted.

== Transport and local amenities ==
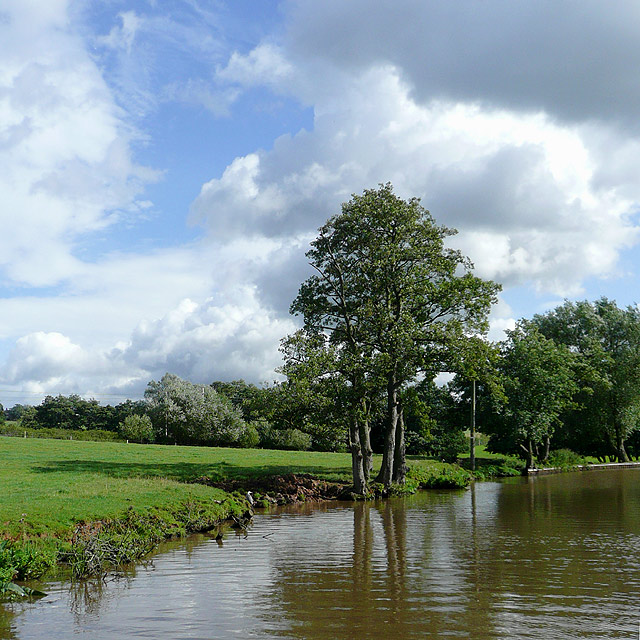
Trent and Mersey Canal at Barlaston

Close by the village are the A34 road, the River Trent, the Trent and Mersey Canal, a route of National Cycle Network, and the railway, which all pass west of it.

Barlaston railway station, opened by the North Staffordshire Railway in 1848, is now on the Manchester branch of the West Coast Main Line, but inter-city trains do not stop and the local passenger service was taken over by rail replacement bus (First Potteries No 23) in 2014, on which all valid railway tickets and passes are accepted. The campaign for the local train service to be restored is continuing.

D&G Bus service 100, the current rail replacement service, from Hanley to Stone via Stoke, Wedgwood, Barlaston and Stone run through Barlaston.

Barlaston Golf Club is to the south of the village.

== Education ==
- Barlaston First School
- 140 years of Barlaston First school
- The Wedgwood Memorial College in Barlaston is a Workers' Educational Association residential college, and also serves as the headquarters of the Esperanto Association of Britain.

== Environment ==
Barlaston and Rough Close Common covers some 50 acres (20 ha) between Barlaston and Blythe Bridge and is a designated local nature reserve.

Downs Banks is located a little to the south-east of Barlaston. It is owned and managed by the National Trust and is also known as 'Barlaston Downs'.

== Parish council ==
Barlaston Parish Council is made up of eleven elected members who serve the community for a period of four years.

=== Election history ===
Barlaston Parish Council is made up of up of 11 councillors elected from three wards. The last elections were in 2019, and resulted in the election of 11 Independent councillors.

==== 2019 election ====
The 2019 Barlaston Parish Council elections an uncontested election occurred in which all 11 seats were filled by independents. This was held alongside the Neighbourhood Plan Referendum on 7 May 2019.

Ward	Party	Parish councillors elected 2019
Barlaston Parish	Independent	Gareth Jones
Barlaston Parish	Independent	Paul Fisher
Barlaston Parish	Independent	Steve Hall
Barlaston Parish	Independent	Daniel W. Bentley
Barlaston Parish	Independent	Chris Hurst
Barlaston Parish	Independent	Ian MacMillan
Barlaston Parish	Independent	Irene Moran
Barlaston Parish	Independent	David Norman
Barlaston Parish	Independent	Viv O’Dunne
Barlaston Parish	Independent	Elaine Philpott
Barlaston Parish	Independent	Sue Tudor JP

== Neighbourhood plan referendum ==
Following the referendum which took place on 2 May 2019, Barlaston residents voted to adopt the neighborhood plan which will now be consulted upon in future planning applications. This also allows for the parish in order to shape the future development of the area.

== Notable people ==
- Francis Wedgwood (1800 – 1888 in Barlaston), a grandson of the English potter Josiah Wedgwood
- Josiah Wedgwood, 1st Baron Wedgwood DSO, PC, DL (1872 in Barlaston – 1943), Josiah Wedgwood IV a British Liberal and Labour politician, the great-great-grandson of Josiah Wedgwood, MP for Newcastle-under-Lyme 1906-1942.
- Sir Ralph Wedgwood, 1st Baronet (1874–1956), the chief officer of the London and North Eastern Railway (LNER) for 16 years
- Felix Wedgwood (1877 in The Upper House, Barlaston – 1917), an author, mountaineer and soldier; died on active service in WWI
- Horace Barks OBE (1895-1983) Lord Mayor of Stoke-on-Trent in 1951–2, cultural interests were Esperanto and writer Arnold Bennett.
- Francis Wedgwood, 2nd Baron Wedgwood (1898–1959), a British artist and hereditary peer.
- Cecily Stella Wedgwood (1904–1995), known as Star Wedgwood, a British ceramicist.
- Harry Davies (1904–1975), footballer, played over 400 games for Stoke City F.C. & Port Vale F.C., then owner and landlord of the Plume of Feathers

== Nearby places ==
- Blythe Bridge
- Downs Banks
- Longton
- Meaford
- Meir
- Oulton
- Tittensor
- Trentham
