= Burslem School of Art =

Former art school in Burslem, England

Coordinates: 53.0448°N 2.1972°W

Burslem School of Art is a listed building in the centre of the town of Burslem in the Potteries district of England. It was built to house the town´s art school. Students from the school played an important role in the local pottery industry. The venue was refurbished and re-opened for the arts in 1999.

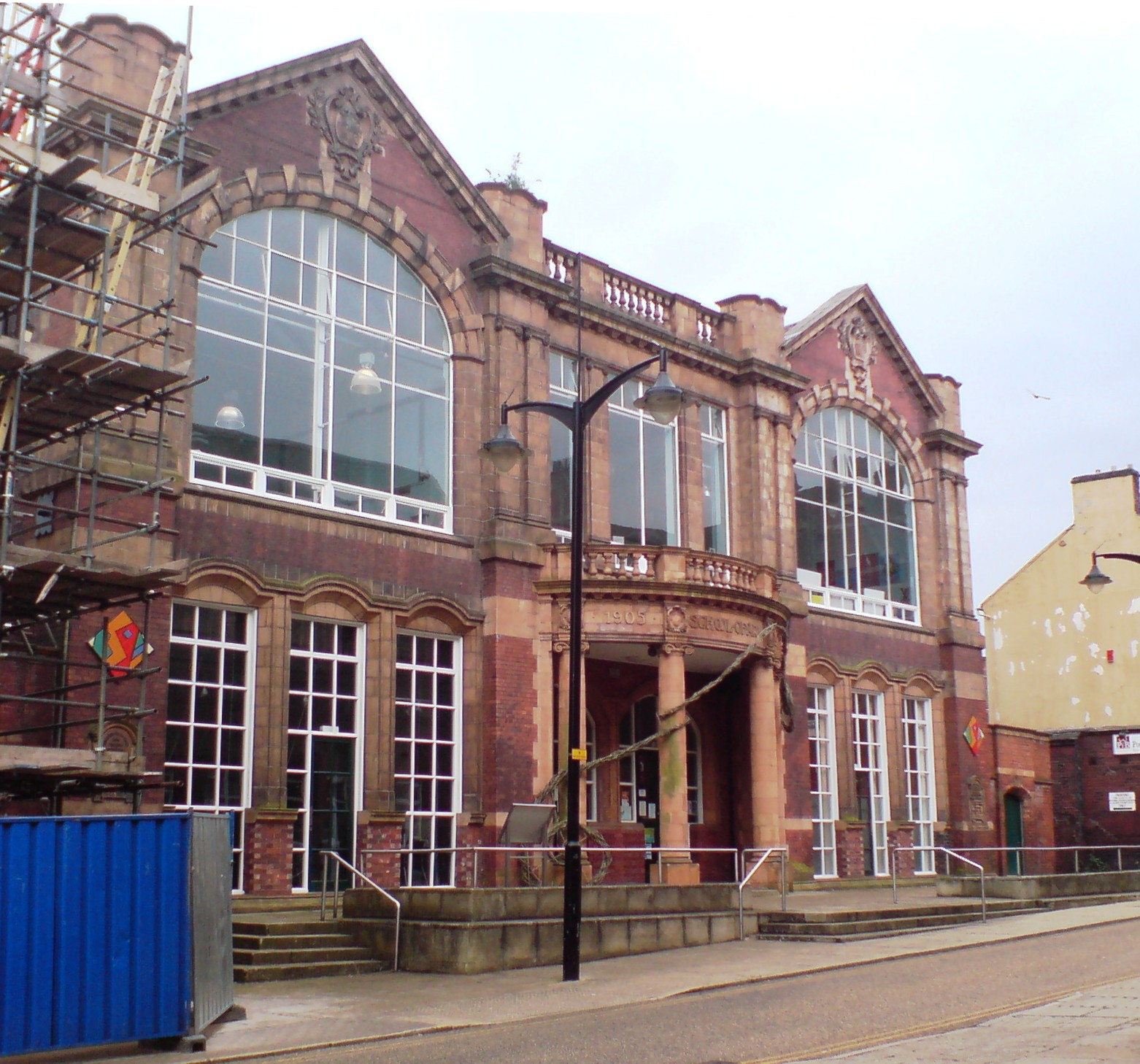
The Burslem School of Art (1905), Queen Street, Burslem, Stoke-on-Trent. Photographed May 2008

== History ==
Pottery was made on the site of the school from the early Middle Ages. The art school originated in 1853. In the nineteenth century each of the towns making up the (future) city of Stoke-on-Trent founded its own art school, the Burslem school moving into the Wedgwood Institute when it was completed in the 1860s. In 1906 the foundation stone was laid of a purpose-built art school, and the institution moved across Queen Street to this accommodation designed by A.R. Wood, a local architect. The new building with its distinctive large windows helped Burlem School of Art become pre-eminent in the district. Its heyday was recalled in Pottery Ladies, a series of TV documentaries made in 1985.

At the time of the foundation of North Staffordshire Polytechnic in 1971, Burslem School of Art was one of three sites used by the Stoke-on-Trent College of Art. However, the Polytechnic's department of Fine Art was moved from Burslem to College Road, Stoke in the 1980s, leaving the historic Burslem building somewhat underused. The School of Art was listed Grade II in 1993, but despite this protection it was left empty and boarded up for a time.

== Refurbishment and re-opening ==
In 1999 the Edwardian building was subject to a £1.2-million refurbishment, and re-opened as an arts centre. It currently runs without a public subsidy, employing three people. It contains three galleries that have shown over 200 exhibitions, as well as containing offices for cultural organisations, and workshop and studio space. In 2008 Burslem public library moved into the building. although at 2015 the School only houses its own substantial book lending collection, housed in its public computer room. A local photography collective now curates the large upper gallery. Regular art ceramics training courses returned to the building in 2012 and continue to run.

== People associated with the school ==
=== Staff ===
Gordon Forsyth, who had designed for Pilkington's Lancastrian Pottery & Tiles, was principal of the Stoke-on-Trent Art Schools in the period 1920–44 and taught at Burslem School of Art. Reginald George Haggar, who was Minton's art director in the 1930s, was the Master-in-Charge of the Burslem School of Art from 1941 to 1945. Other notable staff members included Arthur Berry who featured in at least two television programmes in the Monitor series with Huw Weldon.

=== Notable alumni ===
- Arthur Berry artist and playwright, Berry also taught at his alma mater
- Doris Boulton-Maude, painter and printmaker
- William Bowyer (artist)
- Clarice Cliff, ceramic designer
- Susie Cooper, ceramic designer
- Richard Arthur Ledward, sculptor
- Muriel Pemberton, who "invented art-school training in fashion in Britain"
- Frances Richards, painter, embroiderer and illustrator
- John Shelton, painter and ceramic artist
- Jessie van Hallen, ceramic designer
- Jessie Tait, ceramic designer
- Charles Tomlinson, poet and artist
- Sidney Tushingham, etcher
- Geoffrey Wynne, painter
