= Nicholas Hofgren =

Financier

Nicholas Walton Hofgren
- Born: Nicholas Walton Hofgren; February 7, 1970 (age 56); Washington DC
- Other name: Nick Hofgren
- Citizenship: American
- Education: Emory University; IESA
- Occupation: Financier
- Years active: 1989-present
- Employer: Westly House Partnership
- Known for: Vordere PLC Controversy; Founder of Westley House Partnership; Board member StableDAO
- Spouse: Sophie Conran (m. 2010)
- Parents: Daniel Hogren; Alexandra Smith

Nicholas Hofgren is a London-based financier and fund placement advisor. He married Sophie Conran in 2010 becoming the son-in-law of late Sir Terence Conran, the English designer, restaurateur, retailer and writer.

== Early life ==
Nicholas W. Hofgren was born in Washington, D.C., on 7 February 1970. He is the son of Daniel W. Hofgren, a former aide to President Richard M. Nixon and Alexandra Hofgren, the daughter of F.G Walton Smith, a notable Miami based oceanographer. Nicholas Hofgren grew up in Washington, D.C., and Bermuda before deciding to pursue a career in finance.

== Education ==
He studied English and History at Emory University in Atlanta and later earned a degree in Hyper-Inflationary Finance from the IESA in Caracas. After completing his studies and graduating in 1996, he pursued further graduate studies at the United States Department of Agriculture.

== Career ==
Hofgren has worked in international finance since 1989, working in North America, Latin America, Russia and the UK. He has dealt primarily in private equity partnerships, capital raising, investment and fundraising campaigns in the European Middle Eastern and African territories for various financial organisations including: JP Morgan Chase, Bank of America, Brunswick Capital Partners and ALTA International.

He is currently co-founder of Westly House Partnership, a privately held partnership providing capital raising support to private equity and real estate firms, a company he formed with Christopher Jackson in 2008.

Nicholas was appointed CEO of Vordere PLC on November 15, 2016, a real estate management company listed on the London Stock Exchange.

Nicholas was an executive director of GFG, a PCC structure established in Guernsey on 4 March 2014. In 2019 an investigation led by the Guernsey Financial Services Commission commenced against Nicholas in relation to his involvement with GFG and its failings to meet the minimum requirements for its license in Guernsey. After several years of investigation a final decision was made by the Guernsey Courts to issue Nicholas with a 14 year Prohibition order and a fine of £290,000 which was not imposed due to Nicholas' indigence. Nicholas later appealed this decision but this appeal was denied by the Guernsey courts on 29 November 2024.[10]

He is currently a board member of StableDAO, a stable coin company. StableDAO's Executive Chairman and CEO, Sam Lee is the founder of Hyperfund, a controversial DEFI company that has been accused of defrauding several investors.

An investigative report by Whistleblower Files, published on November 29, 2024, revealed the full extent of the connection between Hofgren's blockchain company, StableDAO, and its alleged involvement in a Ponzi scheme.
