= Wilhide =

Wilhide is a surname. Notable people with the surname include:

- Elizabeth Wilhide, writer of books on design and decoration
- Glenn Wilhide (born 1958), British television screenwriter and producer
- Glenn Calvin Wilhide, design engineer for Black & Decker
