= Gray's Pottery =

British pottery company

- Company type: Private
- Industry: Pottery
- Founded: 1907
- Founder: AE Gray
- Defunct: 1961
- Fate: Acquired
- Successor: Portmeirion Pottery
- Headquarters: Stoke-upon-Trent, England

Gray's Pottery, also spelled as Grays Pottery and formally known as A.E. Gray Ltd. was a British pottery company based in Hanley, Staffordshire, later Stoke-upon-Trent, which existed until it was taken over by Portmeirion Pottery in 1960.

The company was founded by, and named after, Albert Edward Gray (1871–1959). Gray's business began in Stoke-upon-Trent (one of the six towns of the City of Stoke-on-Trent) in 1907 and became a production operation in Mayer Street, Hanley, Stoke-on-Trent by 1912. It returned to Stoke-upon-Trent in 1933 and ceased by 1962. The company, which was noted particularly for the quality of its design in the 1920s and 1930s, took part in every British Industries Fair that was held between 1915 and 1951.

Notable employees of the company include Susie Cooper, who worked for Gray's in the 1920s. She stayed with the company until her 27th birthday in 1929, when she left the company in order to set up her own business.

Samuel (Clyde) Talbot succeeded Cooper as the company's Art Director around 1930, remaining until 1959. He gained national recognition on the National Register of Industrial Art Designers alongside other notable ceramic designers such as Reco Capey, Michael Cardew, Keith Murray, Eric Ravilious and Victor Skellern, as well as Susie Cooper.
