= Port Regis School =

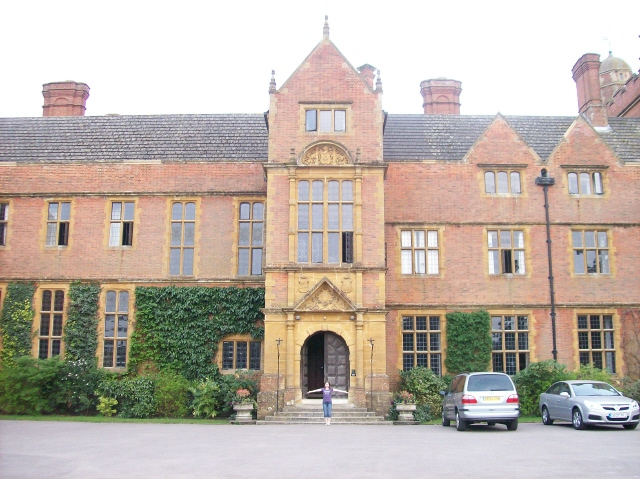
- Main building

Location
- Motcombe Park; Shaftesbury, Dorset, SP7 9QA; England
- 51°01′12″N 2°12′57″W

Information
- Type: Private preparatory school
- Motto: Altiora peto (I seek higher things)
- Established: 1881
- Department for Education URN: 113915 Tables
- Headmaster: Titus Mills
- Gender: Mixed
- Age: 2 to 13
- Enrolment: c. 360
- Houses: 4
- Colours: Navy, White & Maroon
- Website: http://www.portregis.com/

Port Regis School is a co-educational preparatory school located in 140 acres of parkland on the Dorset-Wiltshire border in southern England, situated between the towns of Shaftesbury and Gillingham.

== History ==
The original school was founded by Alfred Praetorius in 1881 in Weymouth Street, London. A few years later it moved to Folkestone and in 1921 to Kingsgate, Broadstairs, in the grounds of which stood an ancient arch, erected by Earl Holland to commemorate a chance landing by Charles II in 1683. This provided the name of the School: Port Regis, "Gate of the King".

In the 1930s, while at Broadstairs, the school was unusual in offering scholarships for the sons of physicians.

In September 1943 Port Regis was evacuated to a wing of Bryanston School in Blandford. After a brief stay at the Earl of Verulam's home at Gorhambury, the School moved in 1947 to Motcombe Park, one mile (1.6 km) from Shaftesbury in Dorset, where it has been ever since.

In 1972 the freehold of the property was acquired. More recent developments include the building of the Jowett sports hall, opened in 1980 by Anne, Princess Royal. The Centenary Hall was opened in 1984.

On 22 February 1991, the Queen's Hall, which houses a heated swimming pool and competition-standard gymnasium with sunken trampoline, was opened by Queen Elizabeth II and Prince Philip, Duke of Edinburgh, while their grandchildren Peter and Zara Phillips were at the school.

The three most recently constructed school buildings are Cunningham Hall (1992), Farrington Music School (2003) and the Upward Academic Centre (2008).

== Boarding houses ==
The Prep school and Pre-Prep together consist of around 300 pupils, with roughly half of them boys and half of them girls. There are four boarding houses:

- Grosvenor (girls aged 11 to 13)
- Mansion Girls (girls aged 7 to 11)
- Prichard (boys aged 11 to 13)
- Mansion Boys (boys aged 7 to 11)

== Staff and governors ==
Since 1933, Port Regis has had six headmasters: John Upward (1933-1968), David Prichard (1969-1993), Peter Dix (1994-2010), Benedict Dunhill (2010-2015), Stephen Ilett (2016-2020), and Titus Mills (2021-).

David Prichard, headmaster from 1969 to 1993, chaired the National Conference for Governors, Bursars and Heads from 1981 to 1993 and simultaneously chaired the Independent Association of Preparatory Schools in 1989–90.

The abstract painter Roger Hilton taught art at the school from 1946 to 1947.

Lt. General Sir Hugh Cunningham was chairman of the school's governing body from 1982 to 1994.

James Iain Stevenson, Brigadier of the British Army was from 17 June 2016 until 1 March 2019 a director of the school.

== Notable former pupils (Old Portregians) ==
- Kwame Anthony Appiah, British philosopher, cultural theorist, novelist and professor at New York University
- Sir Louis Blom-Cooper, barrister, author, and chairman of the Press Council
- Myles Burnyeat, Emeritus Professor of Ancient Philosophy at the University of Cambridge
- Max Clark, professional rugby player at Bath Rugby
- Jasper Conran, designer
- Sebastian Conran, designer and member of the UK Design Council
- John Deeker, pyrotechnician who designed the fireworks display for the 1981 royal wedding of Charles and Diana
- Hilary Dresser, rower for the Great Britain team at the 1992 Summer Olympics in Barcelona.
- Adetomiwa Edun, actor who starred in the British TV series Merlin
- Luke Evans (politician), Member of Parliament for Bosworth (UK Parliament constituency) from 2019.
- Prince Rashid bin El Hassan, member of the Jordanian Royal Family
- Jonathan Gathorne-Hardy, biographer, historian and novelist
- Nick Greenstock, English international rugby player
- Adrian Heath, artist
- George Hurst, Chief Conductor of the BBC Philharmonic Orchestra
- Daisy Lewis, actress who starred in Downton Abbey and Doctor Who
- Hugh Massingberd, journalist and genealogist, known as the father of the modern obituary
- Amelia Maughan, bronze medal-winning swimmer at the 2014 Commonwealth Games
- Tim Payne, English international rugby player
- Peter Phillips, son of Anne, Princess Royal
- Henry Pyrgos, Scottish international rugby player
- Geoffrey Rootes, 2nd Baron Rootes, industrialist and Chairman of Chrysler UK
- Bruce Sharman, film producer and production manager/supervisor of Star Wars (1977) and The Empire Strikes Back (1980)
- Zara Tindall, daughter of Anne, Princess Royal
- Lloyd Wallace, gold medal-winning aerial skier
