= Ivan Klapez =

Croatian sculptor

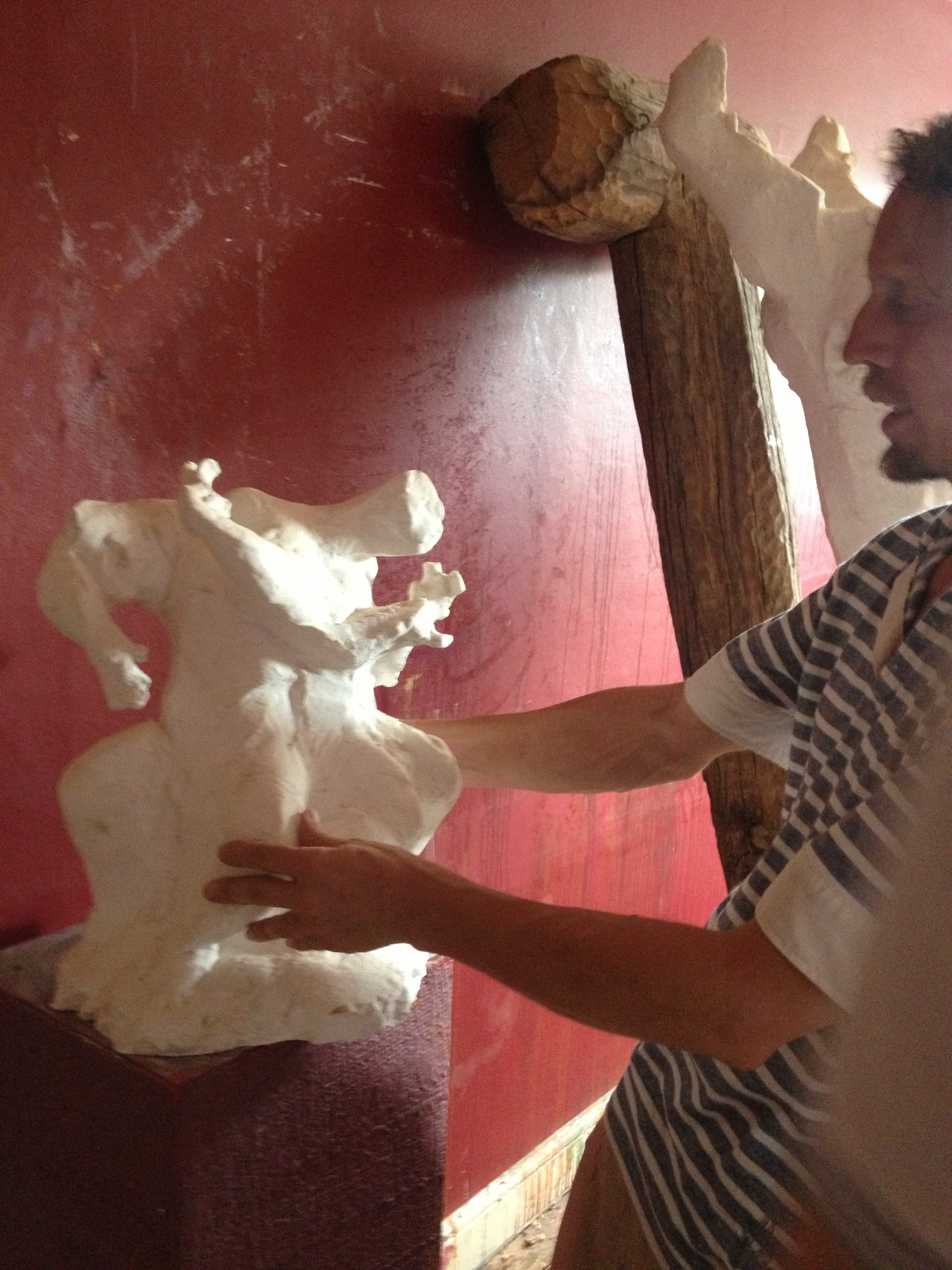
- Ivan Klapez
- Born: Sinj, Croatia
- Education: Artist-in-residence, The Art Academy, London, City & Guilds of London Art School, London, Academy of Fine Arts, University of Zagreb, Art College, Split, Croatia
- Known for: Sculpture
- Notable work: Unity (Nude Dancers)
- Movement: Figurative art, realism
- Patrons: Marco Pierre White
- Website: http://ivanklapez.net

Ivan Klapez (born 1961) is a Croatian sculptor.

== Early life and family ==
Ivan Klapez has been based in London since 1987. Amongst his collectors are Sebastian Conran and he has produced several commissions such as ‘Liberty’, bronze, 1991, Commissioned by The Aims of Industry for The Margaret Thatcher Award.

== Notable works ==
Klapez is known for his figurative sculptures such as the bronze sculpture "Unity" at London Wall, Alban Gate.

== Gallery ==
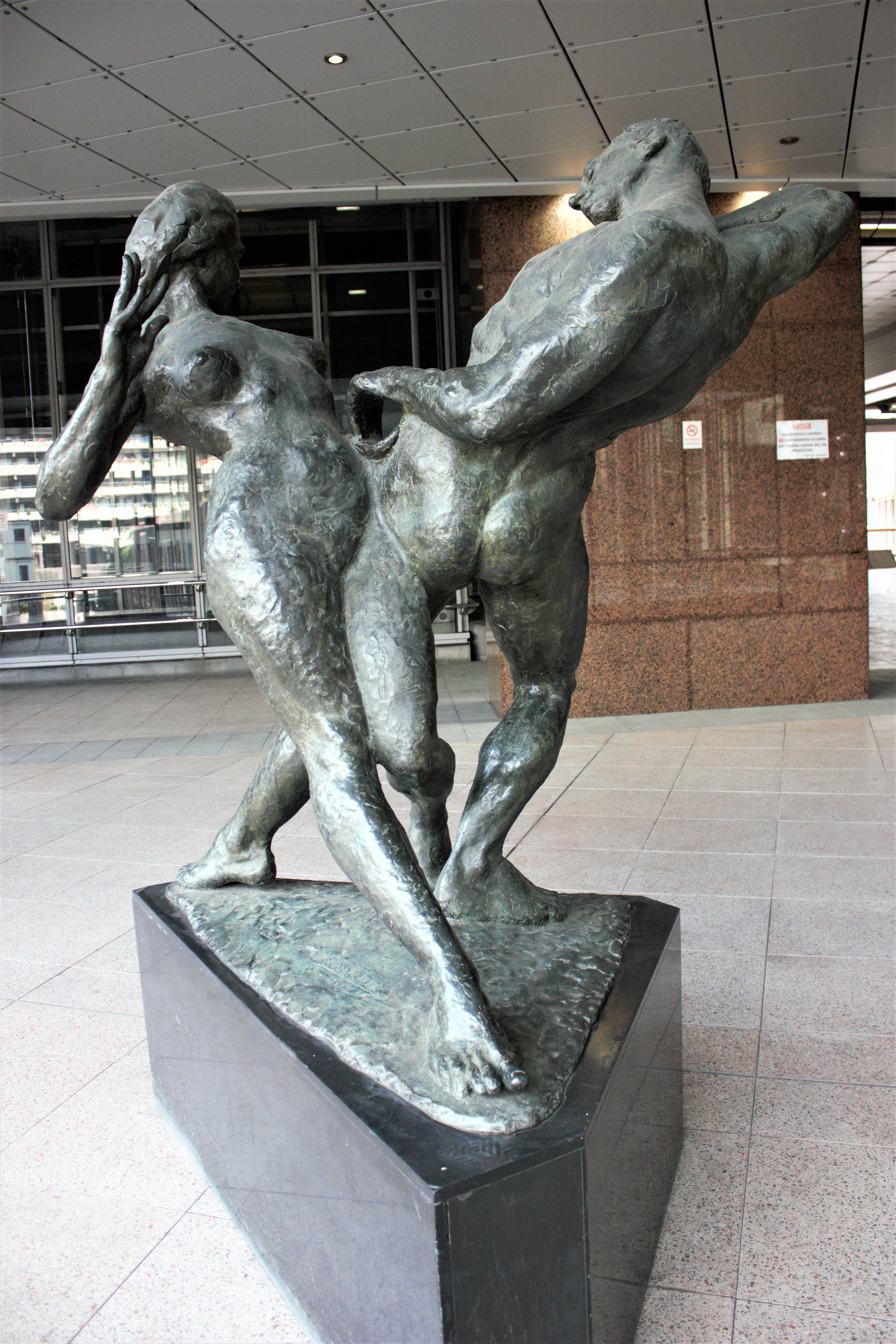

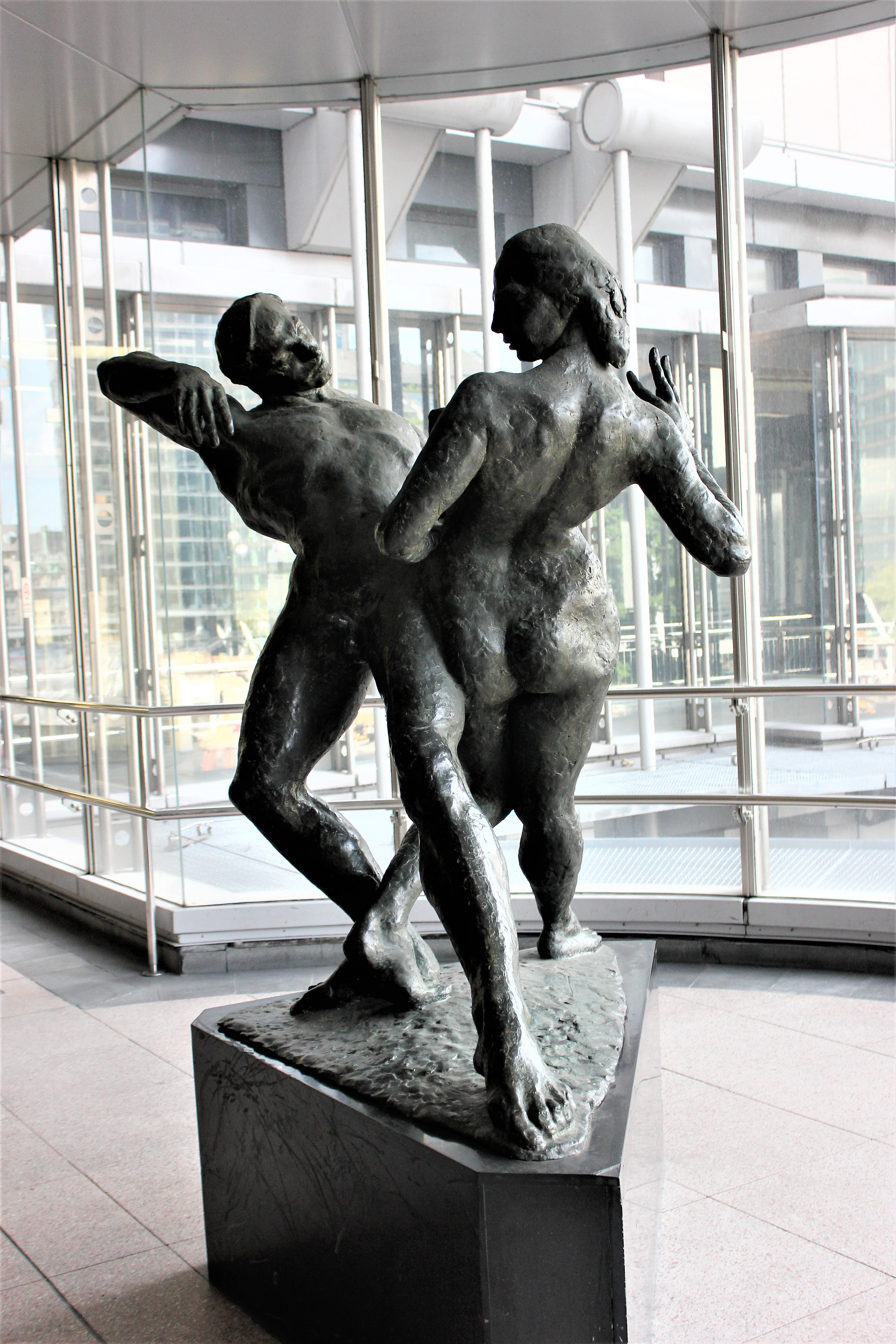
