= Belling =

Belling is a surname. Notable people with the surname include:

- Charles Reginald Belling (1884–1965), manufacturer of electric cookers
- Daniel Belling (born 1986), German politician
- Fem Belling (born 1978), Australian jazz vocalist
- Ingeborg Belling (1848–1927), Norwegian actress
- Johann Georg von Belling (1642–1689), Prussian general
- John Belling (1866–1933), English cytogenetist
- Kylie Belling (born 1964), Australian actress
- Mark Belling (born 1956), Radio talk show host
- Natarsha Belling (born 1970), Australian news anchor
- Rudolf Belling (1896–1972), German sculptor
- Wilhelm Sebastian von Belling (1719–1779), Prussian general

== See also ==
- Belling, an English manufacturer of ovens, cookers etc., now owned by Glen Dimplex
