= Sophie Conran =

British designer and writer (born 1965)

Sophia Conran
- Born: Henrietta Sophia Conran; October 28, 1965 (age 60); United Kingdom
- Occupation: Designer
- Spouses: Alex Willcock (m. 2002, divorced); Nicholas Hofgren (m. 2010; div. 2020)
- Children: Felix Conran; Coco Conran
- Parents: Terence Conran (father); Caroline Conran (mother)
- Relatives: Sebastian Conran (half-brother); Jasper Conran (half-brother)

Henrietta Sophia Conran (born 28 October 1965) is a British designer, retailer, cook and author. She is the founder and director of the Sophie Conran Shop.

== Early life ==
Conran is the daughter of designer and restaurateur Terence Conran and food writer Caroline Herbert. Her brothers Tom and Edmund are both restaurateurs. The fashion designer Jasper Conran and the product designer Sebastian Conran are her half-brothers.

== Career ==
After leaving school at 17, Conran worked as an apprentice for couture milliner Stephen Jones before joining the fashion team at the studio of her brother Jasper. Following this, Conran interior-designed apartments and show flats in the Butler's Wharf development and overhauled the Design Museum Shop's collections, where she also acted as a buyer. At the same time, she worked as a buyer for The Conran Shop and eventually launched her own store, 'Wong Singh Jones'. She began to receive private interior design commissions after buying a flat in Bayswater, reuniting the rooms which had been parcelled out as bed-sits, and renovating them.

In the early 1990s, Conran lived in Australia. On returning to the United Kingdom, she renovated a dilapidated farm in Devon, rearing pigs and growing vegetables. After a few years she returned to work for her father as a Colour Director and then as a Product Manager in a variety of areas. She helped with Jasper's Sackville Street townhouse store before the 2005 opening.

In the food world, Conran created a supper club and then collaborated with her brother Tom on a catering company. In 2004 she launched Sophie Conran Pies, which won four Fine Food Awards.

Her debut cookbook, Pies, was published in November 2006 by HarperCollins, with a mini version entitled Easy Pies later released. Her second book, Soups and Stews, was published by Collins in October 2008. She has written food and entertaining stories for many UK titles including InStyle and Living, and has been a contributing editor to Junior magazine.

In March 2006, Conran's kitchen, glass and tableware range for Portmeirion was launched. It received an Elle Deco Style Award for Best in Kitchens 2006 and the House Beautiful Award for Best in Tableware in 2008. Conran then created a fine dining range, White Oak, launched in the USA.

In December 2007, Conran was a designer in Save the Children's Festival of Trees fundraising event.

In 2009, with Harvey Jones Kitchens, Conran launched 'The Cook's Companion', a freestanding kitchen bench. In 2010 she launched the first of two cutlery collections with Arthur Price. In 2011, she designed a range of garden tools with the Sheffield-based company Burgon & Ball. The range was shortlisted for Product of the Year at the Chelsea Flower Show 2011. She has also collaborated with Melt chocolates of Notting Hill to create a chocolate inspired by sweet pies from her first book and which uses flavours including Earl Grey tea, ginger and cranberry; with bathroom store Drummonds to redesign their Chelsea showroom and design a range of coloured baths; and with wallpaper company Arthouse to create collections for B&Q stores.

The Sophie Conran Shop, sophieconran.com, is Conran's personal homeware company.

== Personal life ==
With her former husband Alex Willcock, Conran has two children, Felix Conran, who was in partnership with his father as a furniture designer, and Coco Conran, a fashion designer. In 2010, she married Nicholas Hofgren, a London-based financier. The marriage ended in 2020, and she then left London and moved full-time to Salthrop House, her residence in Wiltshire.
