= Shirley Conran =

English author and designer (1932–2024)

Dame Shirley Conran DBE
- Conran on the cover of Superwoman (1977)
- Born: Shirley Ida Pearce; 21 September 1932; Middlesex, England
- Died: 9 May 2024 (aged 91); London, England
- Education: St Paul's Girls' School; Chelsea Polytechnic
- Occupations: Novelist; Journalist; Founder
- Known for: Founder of Maths Action; Founder of Maths Anxiety Trust
- Notable work: Lace
- Spouses: Terence Conran (m. 1955; div. 1962) John Stephenson (divorced) Kevin O'Sullivan (divorced)
- Children: Sebastian Conran; Jasper Conran
- Parents: Thirlby Pearce (father); Ida Florence Pearce (mother)
- Awards: Dame Commander of the Order of the British Empire

Dame Shirley Ida Conran DBE (née Pearce; 21 September 1932 – 9 May 2024) was an English author, designer, journalist, and social entrepreneur.

After Conran's marriage to Terence Conran, with whom she worked as a designer and sales director at Conran Fabrics, she became women's editor of The Observer and the Daily Mail, launching its Femail section. After a serious illness left her with myalagic encephalomyelitis, making it difficult for her to work, she wrote best-selling books including the feminist self-help Superwoman (1975) and the bonkbuster Lace (1982).

In later life, Conran campaigned and founded charities to encourage maths education for women. For this, she was made a Dame Commander of the Order of the British Empire and was invested in hospital a week before her death.

== Early life ==
Conran was born as Shirley Ida Pearce on 21 September 1932 in the Municipal Borough of Hendon, Middlesex, to Ida and Thirlby Pearce. She attended St Paul's Girls' School and then went to a finishing school in Switzerland, which later provided some inspiration for the fictional school "L'Hirondelle" in her 1982 novel Lace. Her father ran a prosperous dry-cleaners but was violent when drunk and forced her to leave home at 19 to earn a living. She was taken back after two months after her failure to get a job resulted in malnutrition but her mother gave her a weekly allowance of £3 and she left again in a month. Now thin, she worked as an artist's model and used the income to train as a sculptor at Portsmouth College of Art and as a painter at Chelsea Polytechnic.

== Career ==
Terence Conran ran a café in Chelsea and they married in 1955. She worked with him as a fabric designer and they had two children – Jasper and Sebastian – who have since become designers too. Her husband was unfaithful and refused to reform and so she divorced him.

Following the breakdown of her marriage, Conran turned to writing in order to support her children. She wrote for the Daily Mail and in 1968 became women's editor and launched Femail, the newspaper's first dedicated women's section. Writing in the Mail in 2018, Conran reflected that this was the first time women in British journalism were being allowed free rein to write about what interests them, given "newspapers had only ever included a woman's section about knitting, dress patterns, recipes and the odd interview with worthy charity organisers." For its pioneering work, Conran believes the first edition of "Femail" magazine should be in the Feminist Archives.

Conran also became the women's editor for The Observer, and wrote columns for Vanity Fair. But her career as a full-time journalist was terminated at age 36 when she had a serious viral pneumonia. This left her with myalgic encephalomyelitis/chronic fatigue syndrome – a debilitating condition which was not well understood and made it difficult for her to cope. She made notes to help her with the chores of housework and these were the basis for the book Superwoman, which her friend Patrick Seale pushed her to write by obtaining an advance from a publisher. This was successful and coined the phrase that became a feminist slogan: "Life's too short to stuff a mushroom."

Her first novel, Lace, was published in 1982 by Simon & Schuster and was a huge bestseller, spending 13 weeks on the New York Times Best Seller list, reaching as high as No. 6. It became known as a "bonkbuster" for its many explicit and often bizarre sex scenes. It was adapted into a 1980s US miniseries, starring Phoebe Cates. It contains the infamous line: "Which one of you bitches is my mother?"

== Personal life ==
Conran was married to Terence Conran from 1955 to 1962; they were the parents of two sons: Sebastian and Jasper Conran, both designers. After divorcing him, she married John Stephenson and then Kevin O'Sullivan who were both sales directors. These marriages just lasted two–three years each and, after becoming a successful author, she gave up on marriage as "a woman has to be her own Prince Charming".

In 2009, she wrote that she suffered from ME.

Conran had homes in France and London, and lived in Monaco for several years.

She founded the educational non-profit Maths Action.

She died from pneumonia at a hospital in London on 9 May 2024, at the age of 91.

== Honours ==
Conran was appointed Dame Commander of the Order of the British Empire (DBE) in the Truss resignation honours list for services to mathematics education as the founder of the Maths Anxiety Trust.

== Works ==
=== Fiction ===
- Lace (Simon & Schuster, 1982)
- Lace 2 (1985)
- The Complete Story (omnibus, 1986)
- Savages (1987, movie rights owned by Warner Bros. but never made)
- The Amazing Umbrella Shop (1990 – children's book co-authored with her children Jasper and Sebastian Conran)
- Crimson (1992)
- Tiger Eyes (1994)
- The Revenge (aka Revenge of Mimi Quinn, 1998)

=== Non-fiction ===
- Superwoman (1975)
- Superwoman 2 (1977)
- Superwoman in Action (1979)
- Futurewoman: How to Survive Life After Thirty (1981)
- The Magic Garden (1983)
- Down with Superwoman: For Everyone Who Hates Housework (1990)
- Money Stuff (2014)

=== Other ===
- The Magic Garden was adapted as a computer program and published by Acornsoft for the BBC Micro as Shirley Conran's Magic Garden in 1983.
