= Jasper Conran =

British fashion designer (born 1959)

Jasper Conran OBE
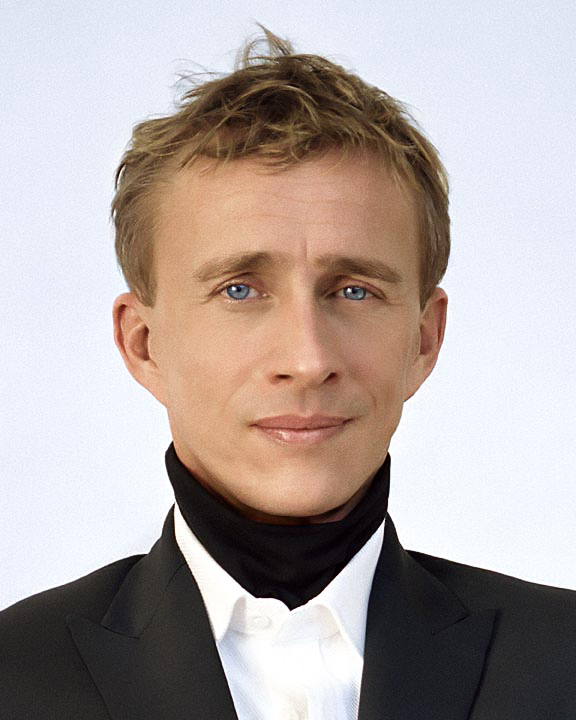
- Conran in 2004
- Born: Jasper Alexander Thirlby Conran; 12 December 1959 (age 66); London, England
- Citizenship: United Kingdom
- Education: Bryanston School; Port Regis School; Parsons School of Art and Design
- Occupation: Fashion designer
- Height: 1.73 m (5 ft 8 in)
- Spouse: Oisin Byrne (m. 2015)
- Parents: Terence Conran (father); Shirley Pearce (mother)
- Relatives: Sebastian Conran (brother); Sophie Conran (half-sister)
- Awards: Order of the British Empire
- Website: Official website

Jasper Alexander Thirlby Conran OBE (born 12 December 1959) is a British designer. He has worked on collections of clothing for men and women, for the home, as well as productions for the stage in ballet, opera and theatre.

== Early life ==
He is the second son of Sir Terence Conran, a designer, and Shirley Pearce, an author; his parents divorced when he was two. He was educated at Port Regis School and Bryanston School in the 1970s; he also studied at the Parsons School of Art and Design in New York, United States (US).

== Career ==
Conran's first collection was for Henri Bendel in New York City. In 1978, aged 19, Conran designed his first womenswear collection under his own name. The following year he was elected to be part of the London Designer collections. Conran designed his first menswear collection in 1985. Conran designed the wedding dress of Princess Margaret's daughter, Lady Sarah Chatto (formerly Lady Sarah Armstrong-Jones) in 1994. He also designed clothes for Diana, Princess of Wales.

In 1989 Conran collaborated with Land Rover Ltd on the interior of the then new Land Rover Discovery.

In 1999, he began designing a signature range of stemware for Stuart Crystal and later for Waterford Crystal. In 2001, he launched a fine bone china tableware collection for Wedgwood.

In 1996, Conran launched a womenswear range for the Debenhams chain of department stores in the UK. He has subsequently designed women's accessories, lingerie, hosiery, menswear, men's accessories, childrenswear, and homeware for the company.

Conran has released furnishing, fabric and wallpaper collections for Designers Guild, as well as a range of signature fragrances and luggage.

In 2004, Conran designed and launched a three-range fireplace collection for Chesney's. He launched the Jasper Conran Optical in 2008.

Conran was a Governor at Bryanston School from 2007 to 2009 and a trustee of The Architecture Foundation (2010–2012) and the Wallace Collection (2007–2015).

Conran is the chairman and chief executive of Jasper Conran Holdings Ltd. He was appointed creative director of The Conran Shop in 2011, and, in 2012, was appointed as the chairman where he spent three years conceiving and implementing a strategy to reinvigorate and reposition the business. In March 2014, Conran was appointed chairman of Conran Holdings Ltd, stepping down in 2015.

Conran published his first book, Jasper Conran Country in 2010. The 300-page photographic essay was completed during a year of exploration around the English countryside.

In 2016 Conran opened his first hotel in the medina in Marrakesh, L'Hotel Marrakech. In 2017 L'Hôtel Marrakech was listed as 1 of 75 in the Hot List 2017: Best New Hotels in the World, Condé Nast Traveler USA and 1 of 55 'Best New Hotels in the World by Conde Nast Traveller UK. In 2018 L'Hôtel Marrakech was included on the Condé Nast Traveler USA Gold List 2018. Condé Nast Traveler USA and Condé Nast Traveler UK both listed L'Hôtel Marrakech as one of their editors all-time favourite hotels on their respective 2019 Gold Lists.

Conran has served several times on the British Fashion Council, and is a visiting professor at the University of the Arts London.

== Performing arts ==
Throughout his career, Conran has pursued his passion for the performing arts — he has designed costumes and sets for fourteen ballet, opera and theatre productions.

Conran collaborated with David Bintley on the Royal Ballet's production of Tombeaux, held at Covent Garden, and a series of productions by the Birmingham Royal Ballet, including The Nutcracker Sweeties, Brahms/Handel Variations, The Shakespeare Suite and Arthur Part I & II. He also designed the set and costumes for Bintley's The Compleat Consort, produced for the Bayerisches Staatsballett in Munich, Germany.

Other works include the production of My Fair Lady directed by Simon Callow, Donzetti's opera Maria Stuarda for ENO and Galina Samsova's productions of Swan Lake and The Sleeping Beauty for the Scottish Ballet.

In 1991, Conran won the Laurence Olivier Award for Costume Design for Jean Anouilh's The Rehearsal at the Almeida Theatre in London, UK.

Full list of productions

- The Rehearsal, Jean Anouilh, 1991 (Laurence Olivier Award, 1991)
- My Fair Lady, Simon Callow, 1992
- Tombeaux, David Bintley, 1993, Royal Opera House
- Sleeping Beauty, Galina Samsova, 1994, Scottish Ballet
- Brahms/Handel Variations, David Bintley, 1994, Birmingham Royal Ballet
- Stravinsky Symphony in C, 1994, Bavarian State Opera, Munich
- The Complete Consort, David Bintley, 1994, Bayerisches Staatsballett, Munich
- Swan Lake, Galina Samsova, 1995, Scottish Ballet
- Edward II, David Bintley, 1995, Birmingham Royal Ballet
- The Nutcracker Sweeties, David Bintley, 1996, Birmingham Royal Ballet
- Maria Stuarda, Donizetti, 1998, English National Opera
- The Shakespeare Suite, David Bintley, 1999, Birmingham Royal Ballet
- Arthur Part I, David Bintley, 2000, Birmingham Royal Ballet
- Arthur Part II, David Bintley, 2001, Birmingham Royal Ballet
- Within the Golden Hour, Christopher Wheeldon, 2019, Royal Opera House

== Personal life ==
Conran is gay. In 2009, he was ranked number 66 in the annual Pink List of 100 influential gay and lesbian people in Britain, published by The Independent on Sunday. In 2010, this list described him as a "National Treasure". In December 2015, he married Irish artist and performer Oisin Byrne.

Conran has bought and restored a string of English period and country houses. In 1984, Conran bought a house in Regent's Park Terrace for £160,000. For a time Conran lived at Flemings Hall in Bedingfield, Suffolk. Flemings Hall is an Elizabethan manor house with a Saxon moat. Conran bought it in 2002 from the photographer Angus McBean. He sold the property in 2006. After this, he purchased Walpole House on Chiswick Mall (a waterfront street on the north bank of the river Thames located near Chiswick House and Gardens). He later purchased (and restored over five years) Ven House in Milborne Port, Somerset. In 2017, Conran sold his apartment in New Wardour Castle in Wiltshire and purchased the manor house at Bettiscombe in Dorset, a house that had previously belonged to his step-mother, Caroline Conran.

== Awards ==
- 1982: Fil d'Or International Linen Award
- 1983: Fil d'Or International Linen Award
- 1986: Designer of the Year by the British Fashion Council
- 1987: Fashion Group of America Award
- 1991: The Laurence Olivier Award for 'Costume Designer of the Year' – Jean Anouilh's "The Rehearsal"
- 1991: The British Fashion Council's British Collections Award
- 2003: 'The Prince's Medal', Homes and Gardens Classic Design Award
- 2004: Honorary doctorate from Heriot-Watt University
- 2005: The Design and Decoration 'Objects of Desire' Award
- 2006: Honorary doctorate at the University of East Anglia.
- 2006: Homes and Gardens 'Classic Design' Award
- 2008: Appointed Officer of the Order of the British Empire (OBE) in the 2008 New Year Honours for services to retail industry.
- 2011: Condé Nast Traveller:Innovation & Design Award for 'Style on the Move' with Tripp Luggage

== Bibliography ==
- Country. Conran Octopus, 2010. ISBN 1-84091-518-8
