= Amabel Williams-Ellis =

English writer (1894–1984)

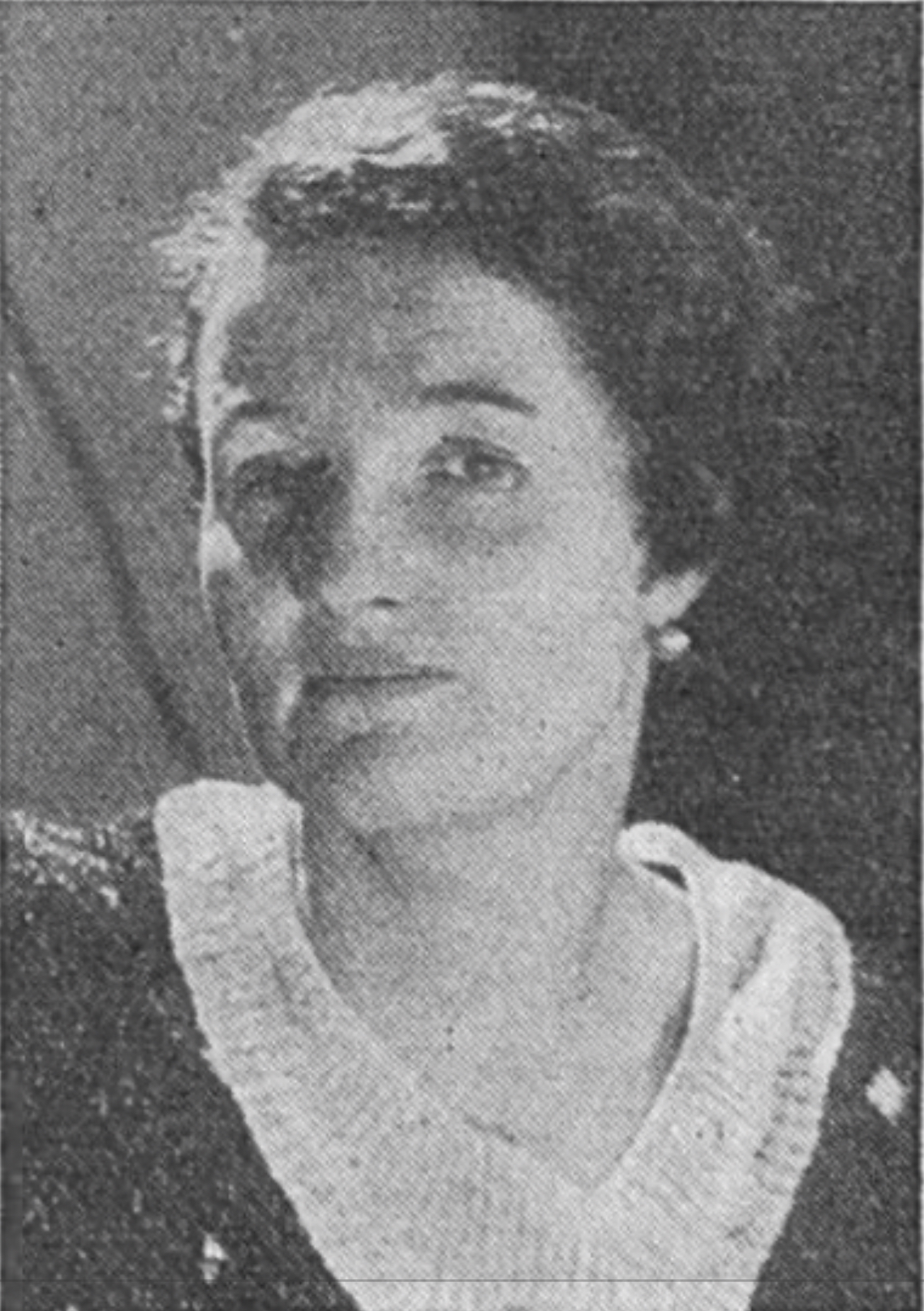
Britannia and Eve (1933)

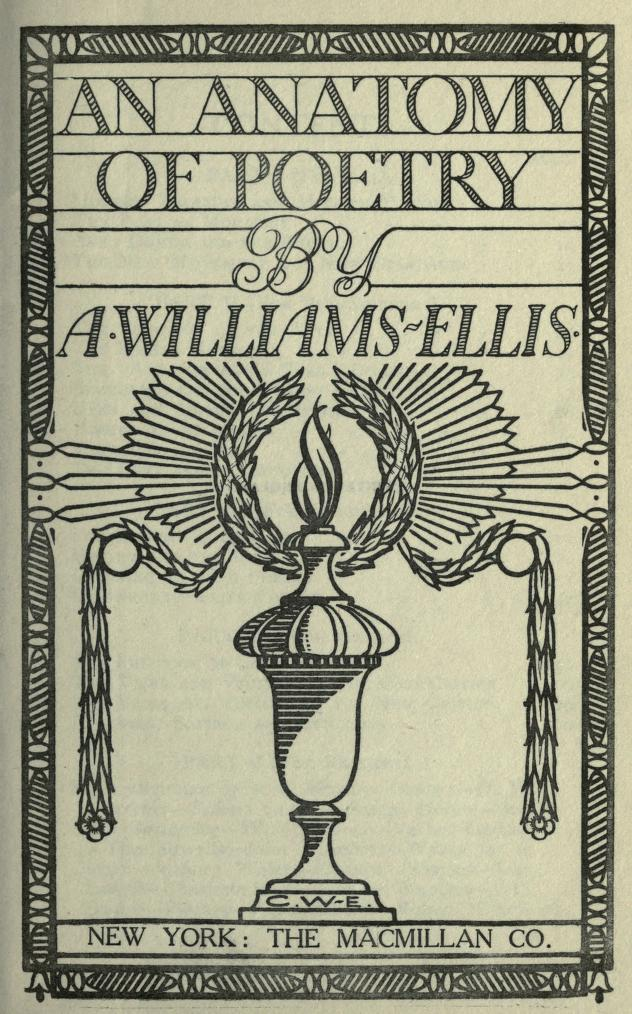
Anatomy of Poetry (1922) by Williams-Ellis

Amabel Williams-Ellis (née Mary Annabel Nassau Strachey; 10 May 1894 – 27 August 1984) was an English writer, editor and critic. As well as publishing her own writings, Williams-Ellis was a prolific editor, translator, and anthologist, compiling collections of fairy stories, folk tales, and science fiction.

== Life ==
Amabel Nassau Strachey was born at Newlands Corner, near Guildford, Surrey, to journalist and newspaper proprietor John Strachey and Amy (née Simpson). Her cousin was Lytton Strachey, and her childhood described as 'glittering and comfortable'.

During World War I, Amabel served as a Voluntary Aid Detachment nurse, which partly inspired an increasing interest in science and anatomy. This led in turn to her scientific writings for children, particularly on notable discoveries and responses to the typical inquiries of children.

On 31 July 1915, Amabel married Clough Williams-Ellis, an architect, with whom she collaborated on a history of the Tank Corps. The couple also worked together on The Pleasures of Architecture (1924), and other works. They had three children: a son and two daughters. Their daughter, Susan Caroline Williams-Ellis (1918–2007) was a successful ceramics designer and manufacturer. Their son was killed during World War II.

Between 1922 and 1923, she was literary editor of The Spectator. Attracted to socialism, Williams-Ellis described herself as a "class traitor".

== Works ==
Over the course of her life, Williams-Ellis wrote more than 40 books. These included novels, books for children, and histories. She wrote regularly for periodicals, and edited multiple volumes of folk legends, fairy tales, and science fiction. She was significantly inspired by the writer and explorer Mary Kingsley, whom Williams-Ellis had met in childhood, and whom she described as "an anthropologist before anthropology". The Times described Williams-Ellis as someone who "wrote books to find things out, and seemed prepared to take on anything."

== Death ==
Amabel Williams-Ellis died on 27 August 1984, at the age of 90. Shortly before her death, she published a memoir: All Stracheys Are Cousins. This showed, wrote The Times, that she was "an undiminished optimist who had lived a busy and a happy life, and enjoyed her second living of it on the page."

== Publications ==
- The Tank Corps (1919) with Clough Williams-Ellis
- An anatomy of poetry (1922)
- The pleasures of architecture (1924) with Clough Williams-Ellis
- Men who found out: stories of great scientific discoverers (1929)
- The exquisite tragedy; an intimate life of John Ruskin (1929)
- The voyage of the Beagle; adapted from the narratives and letters of Charles Darwin and Capt. Fitz Roy (1931)
- The art of being a woman (1951)
- Fairy tales from the British Isles (1960)
- Darwin's moon: a biography of Alfred Russel Wallace (1966)
- Old World & New World fairy tales (1966)
