= Alex Willcock =

British designer and entrepreneur

- Born: Alexander Saul Murray Willcock; 6 March 1964 (age 62); England
- Education: Eton College
- Occupation: Designer
- Known for: Founder of Maker&Son; Founder of Imagini; Founder of The Nest
- Spouse: Sophie Conran (m. 2002, divorced)
- Children: 5

Alex Willcock (born 1964) is a British designer and entrepreneur. He is a co-founder of The Nest, the founder and former CEO of Imagini, and a co-founder, with his son Felix Conran, of Maker&Son.

== Career ==
=== The Nest ===
Alex Willcock co-founded the design and brand consultancy The Nest in 1999 with Russell Pinch and Rachel Marshall. The company was sold to St Luke's in 2004.

=== Imagini ===
Imagini was a London-based software company established in 2006. The firm specialised in using images rather than traditional questions for marketing purposes. One of its software applications compared an individual's image selections with those in a database to identify and suggest others with similar preferences and worldviews.

=== Maker&Son ===
In 2018, Willcock and his son Felix Conran co-founded the luxury furniture company Maker&Son. The company quickly gained recognition for its high-quality, handcrafted products including luxury sofas. In 2022, they sold the business to Inc & Co Group.

=== Public speaking ===
On 25 January 2020, Willcock delivered a talk at TEDx Glasgow, where he explored the topic of the language of feelings.

== Education ==
Willcock was awarded a scholarship to study classical music at Eton College, where he honed his musical talent, particularly in playing the violin, which he had taken up a few years earlier. His appreciation for both classical and classic music has influenced his personal and professional endeavours.

== Personal life ==
Willcock and his former wife, Sophie Conran, have two children, Felix Conran, who collaborates with his father as a furniture designer, and Coco Conran, who established herself as a fashion designer. Alex Willcock and Sophie Conran are now divorced.

In addition, Willcock has three children from another marriage.
