= Portmeirion Pottery =

British pottery company

Portmeirion Group PLC
- Company type: Public
- Traded as: LSE: PMP
- ISIN: GB0006957293
- Industry: Pottery
- Founded: 1960
- Founder: Susan Williams-Ellis, Euan Cooper-Willis
- Headquarters: Stoke-on-Trent, England
- Key people: Michael Scheepers (Chief Executive); Peter Tracey (Chairman)
- Products: Homeware
- Revenue: GBP 92 million (2019)
- Operating income: GBP 7.5 million (2019)
- Net income: GBP 5.8 million (2019)
- Total assets: GBP 82 million (2019)
- Total equity: GBP 48 million (2019)
- Number of employees: 847
- Subsidiaries: Nambé International; Pimpernel; Portmeirion; Royal Worcester; Spode; Wax Lyrical England

Portmeirion is a British pottery company based in Stoke-on-Trent, England. They specialise in earthenware tableware.

== History ==
Portmeirion Pottery began in 1960 when pottery designer Susan Williams-Ellis (daughter of Sir Clough Williams-Ellis, who created the Italian-style Portmeirion Village in North Wales) and her husband, Euan Cooper-Willis, took over a small pottery-decorating company in Stoke-on-Trent called A. E. Gray Ltd, also known as Gray's Pottery. Susan Williams-Ellis had been working with A.E. Gray for some years, commissioning designs to sell at the gift shop in Portmeirion Village, the items bearing the backstamp "Gray's Pottery Portmeirionware". In 1961, the couple purchased a second pottery company, Kirkhams Ltd, that had the capacity to manufacture pottery, and not only decorate it. These two businesses were combined and Portmeirion Potteries Ltd was born.

Susan Williams-Ellis' early Portmeirion designs included Malachite (1960), Moss Agate (1961) and Talisman (1962). In 1963, she created the popular design Totem, an abstract pattern based on primitive forms coupled with a cylindrical shape.

She later created Magic City (1966) and Magic Garden (1970), but arguably Portmeirion's most recognised design is the Botanic Garden range, decorated with a variety of floral illustrations adapted from Thomas Green's Universal or-Botanical, Medical and Agricultural Dictionary (1817), and looking back to a tradition begun by the Chelsea porcelain factory's "botanical" designs of the 1750s. It was launched in 1972 and, with new designs added periodically, is still made today, the most successful ceramics series of botanical subjects. More recent designs have included Sophie Conran's Crazy Daisy and Dawn Chorus.

On 23 April 2009, Portmeirion Potteries Ltd purchased the Royal Worcester and Spode brands, after they had been placed into administration the previous November. Portmeirion Potteries has since changed its company name to Portmeirion Group to reflect this acquisition. The purchase did not include the manufacturing facilities of Royal Worcester or Spode. The manufacture of much of Spode's ware was returned to Britain from the Far East, to the Portmeirion Group's factory in Stoke-on-Trent.

Portmeirion purchased Nambé Mills in 2019 for 12 million dollars, its first expansion of the business outside of the UK. The acquisition provided the company with a stronger influence in the US market, as Nambé’s sales had been largely concentrated in the US through wholesale channels, online and through retail stores across New Mexico and Arizona. Production includes woodware (produced in Thailand) stainless steel flatware (Vietnam) and crystal glassware. As a subsidiary of Portmeirion, it now trades as Nambé International.

In 2019, the Victoria and Albert Museum mounted an exhibition of Portmeirion pottery.

== Gallery ==
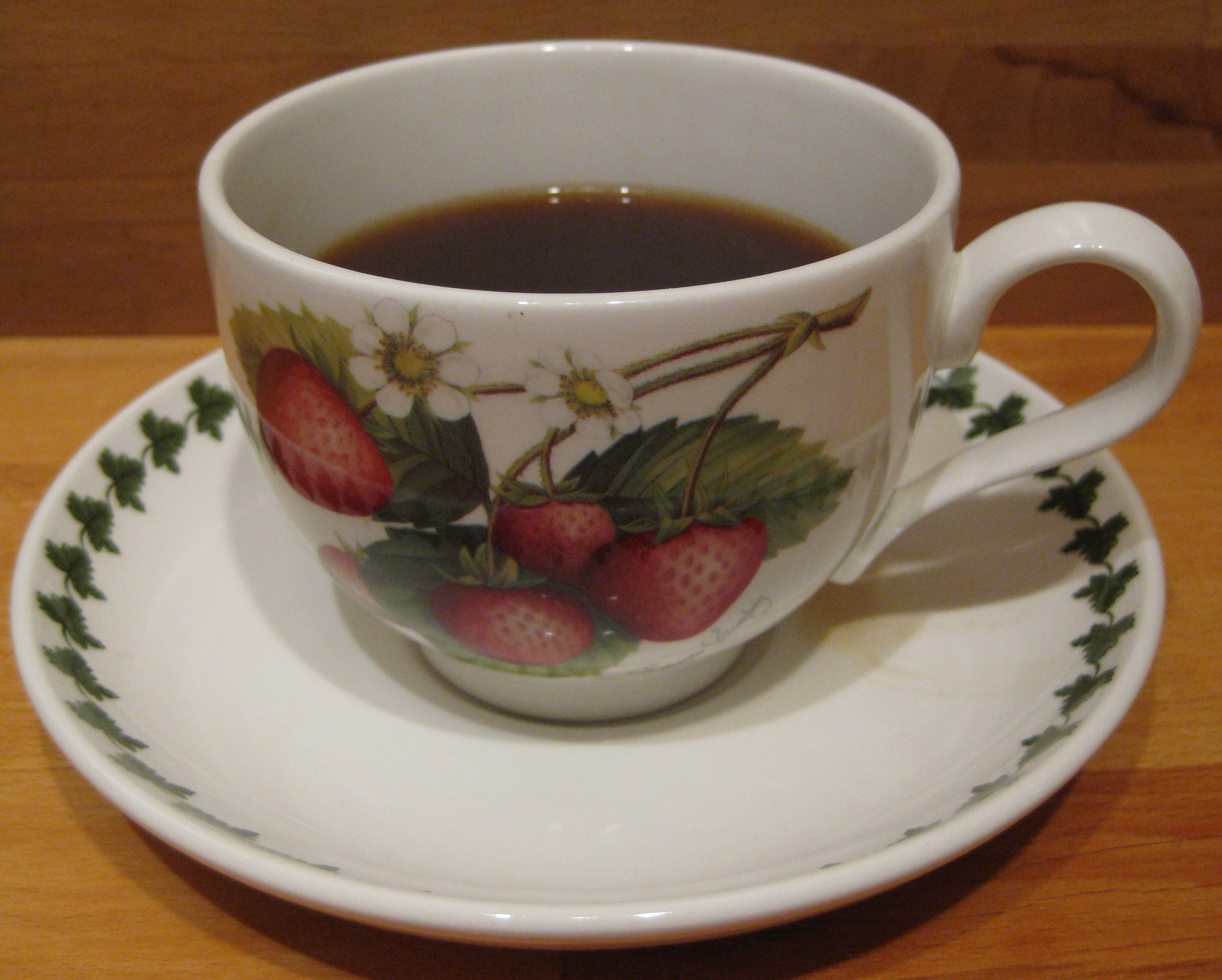
A Portmeirion “botanical” cup depicting strawberries

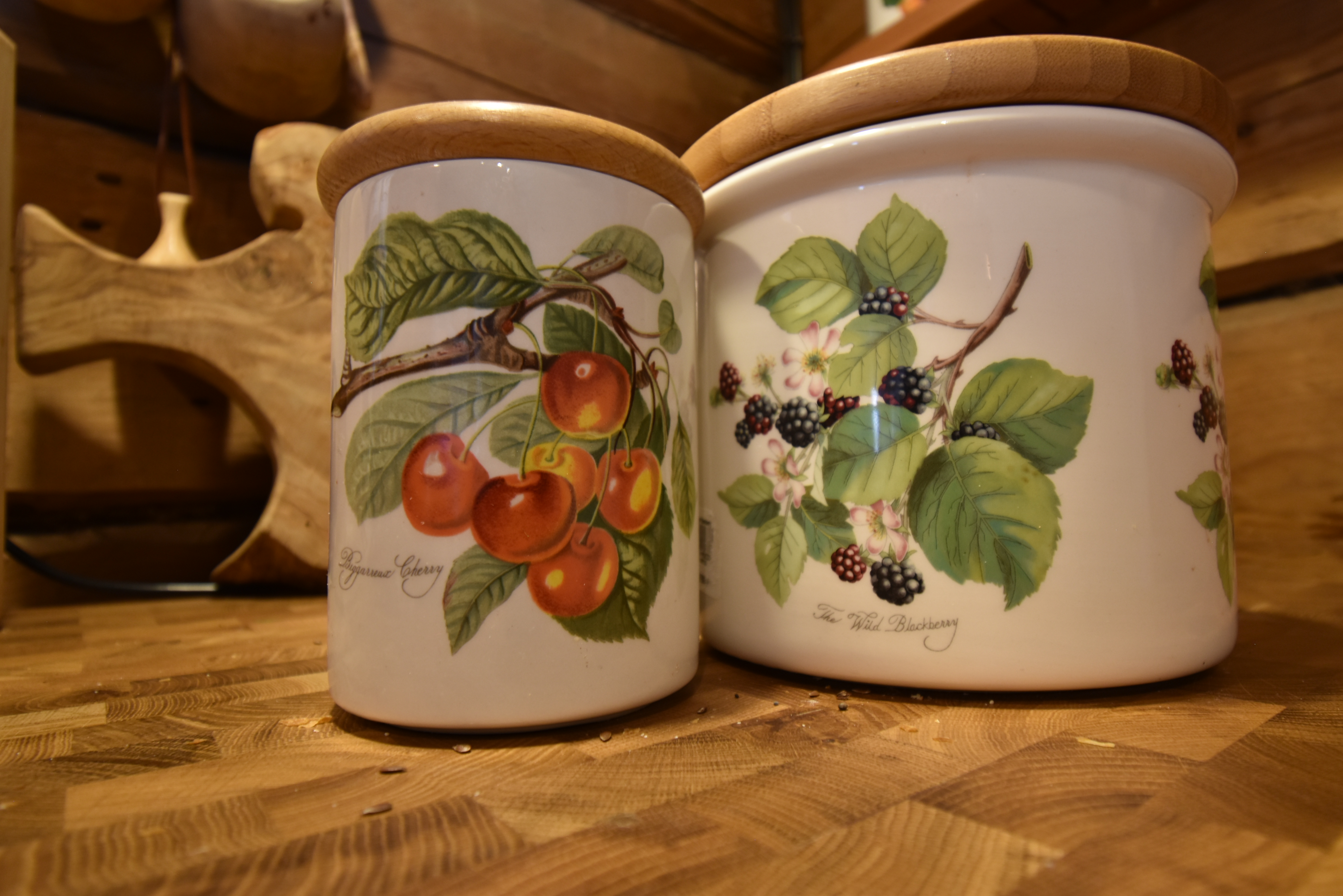
Two Portmeirion “botanical” jars depicting Bigarreaux cherry and wild blackberry

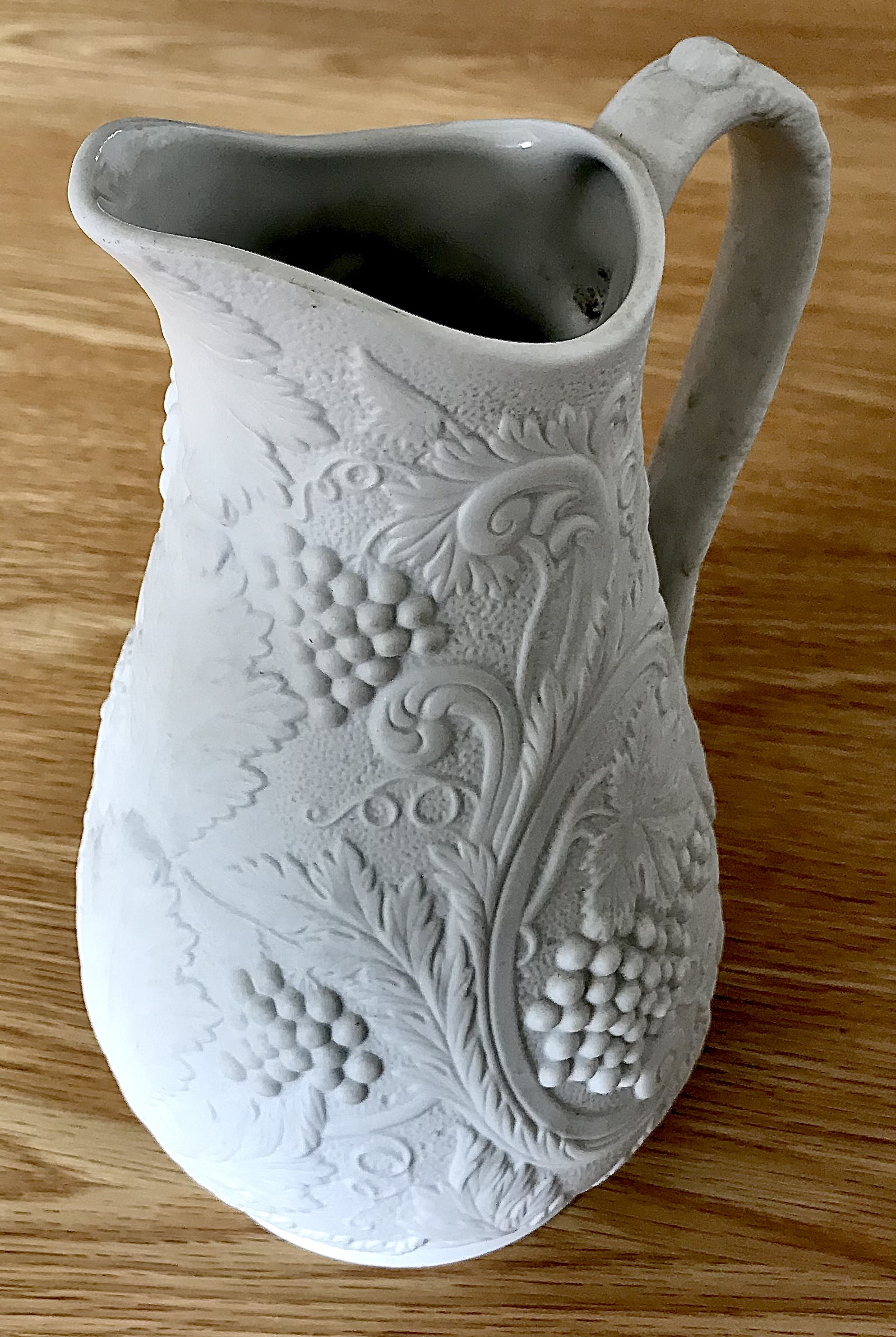
A Portmeirion
Parian Ware ewer (circa 1987) decorated with a low-relief, grapevine pattern

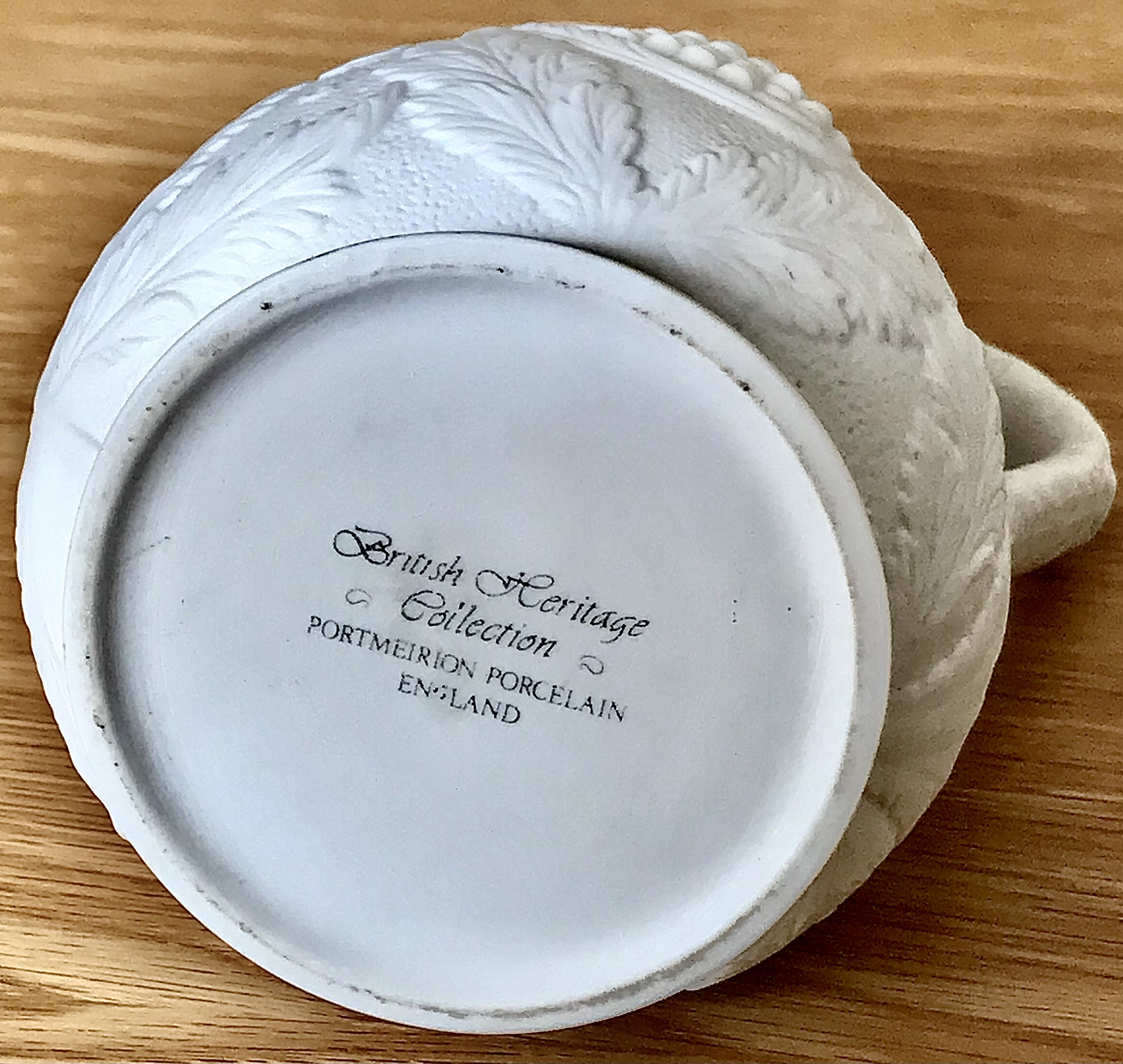
Base of same grapevine ewer showing inscription ‘British Heritage Collection’

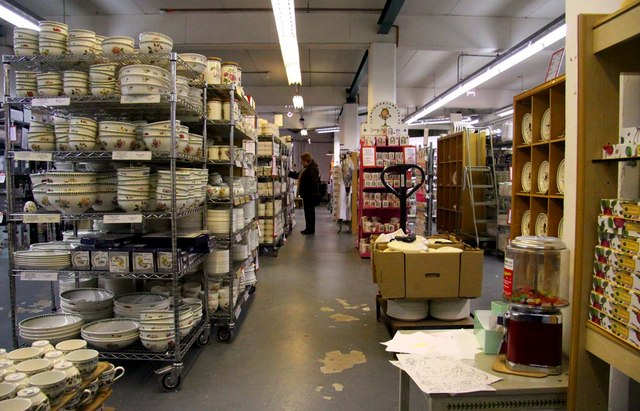
Portmeirion's factory shop

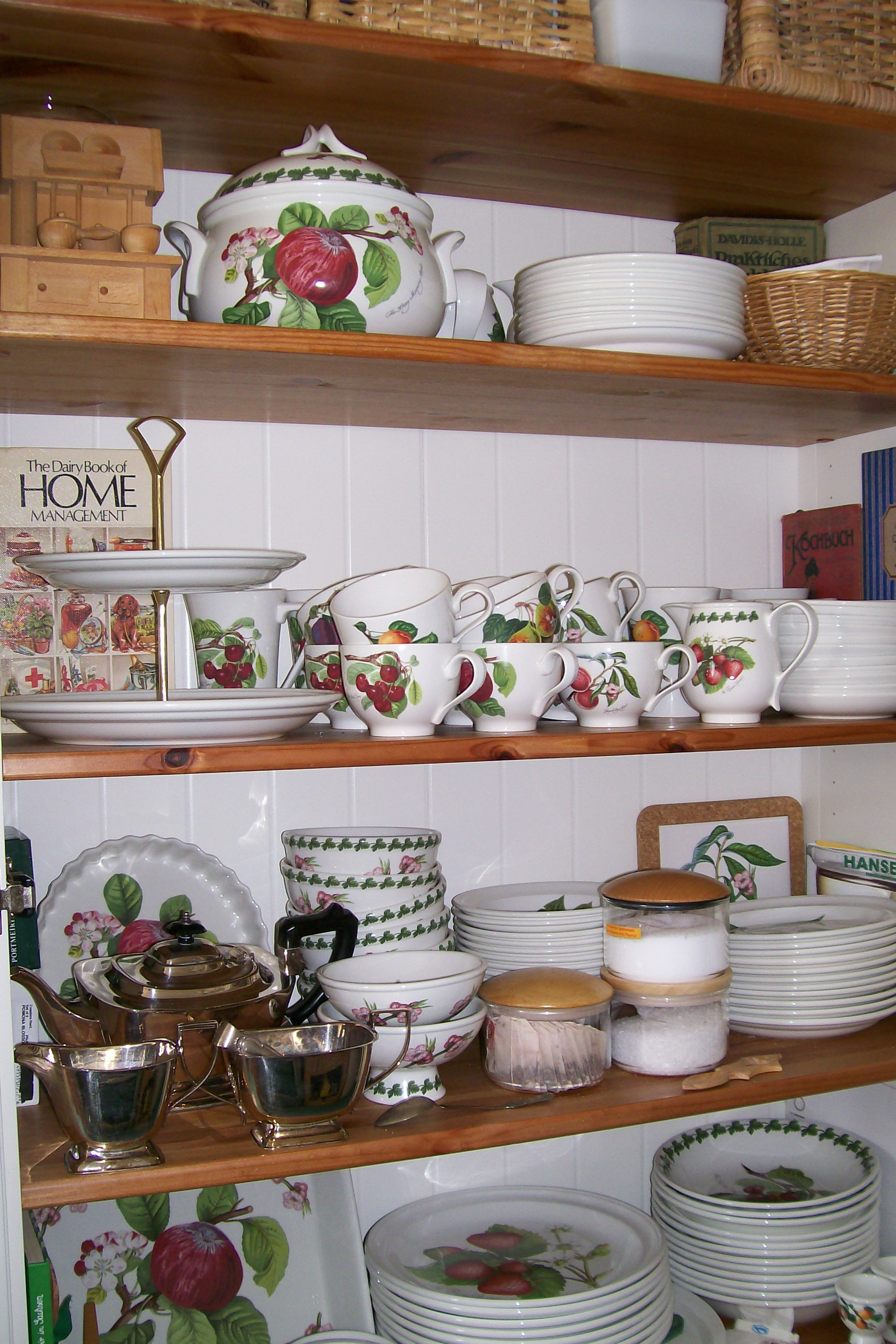
A range of Portmerion's products

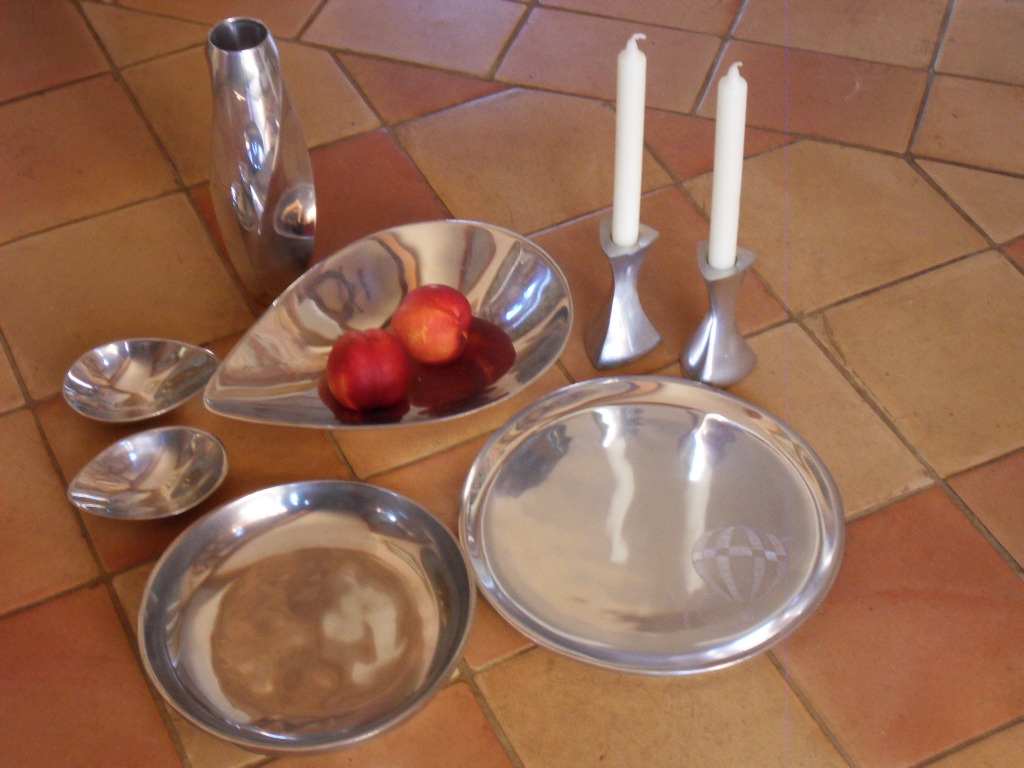
Samples of Nambé metalware designs
