= F.G. Walton Smith =

Dr. F.G. Walton Smith (1909–1989) was an oceanographer who founded the first marine laboratory at the University of Miami, which ultimately grew into the university's Rosenstiel School of Marine, Atmospheric, and Earth Science.

== Early life and education ==
Originally from Bristol, England, Smith received his doctorate from the University of London in biology before going on to study in the Bahamas. In 1940, he accepted a faculty position at the University of Miami. Three years later, in 1943, he started the university's marine laboratory with only a secretary and two assistants in a small boathouse.

== Career ==
In 1953, Smith established the International Oceanographic Foundation to encourage scientific study and exploration of the oceans, which led to the opening of a marine exhibition called Planet Ocean at Biscayne Bay. The laboratory Smith founded is now the Rosenstiel School of Marine, Atmospheric, and Earth Science. In 1969, he was appointed dean of the school. Smith was also chairman of the Gulf and Caribbean Fisheries Institute for ten years from 1948.

With Henry Chapin, Smith wrote two books, The Ocean River (1952), and The Sun, the Sea and Tomorrow (1954).

The primary research vessel of the University of Miami's Rosenstiel School is the F.G. Walton Smith, named in Smith's honor.

== Personal life ==
Smith lived with his wife May in Key Biscayne, Florida and had one daughter, Alexandra Hofgren and a grandson, Nicholas Hofgren. He was 80 years old when he died of heart failure in Miami in 1989.
