= Motcombe =

Village and civil parish in Dorset, England

Coordinates: 51.0308°N 2.2182°W

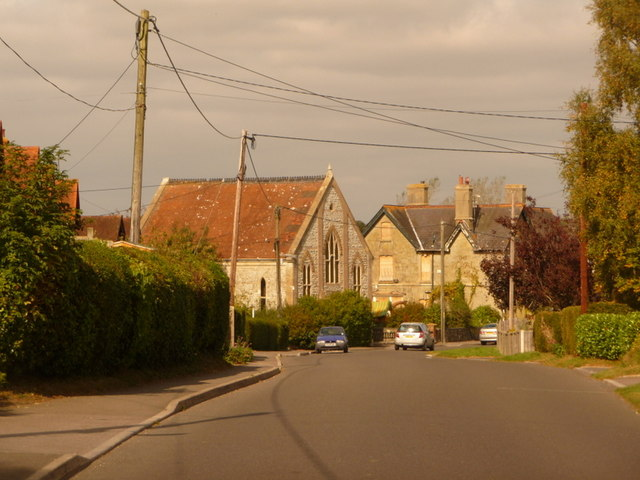
- The Street, Motcombe

- Location within Dorset
- Population: 1,474 (2011)
- OS grid reference: ST8526
- Civil parish: Motcombe
- Unitary authority: Dorset
- Ceremonial county: Dorset
- Region: South West
- Country: England
- Sovereign state: United Kingdom
- Post town: SHAFTESBURY
- Postcode district: SP7
- Dialling code: 01747
- Police: Dorset
- Fire: Dorset and Wiltshire
- Ambulance: South Western
- UK Parliament: North Dorset

Motcombe /ˈmɒtkəm/ is a village and civil parish in north Dorset, England. It lies about two miles (three kilometres) north of Shaftesbury. It is sited on Kimmeridge clay soil beneath hills at the edge of the Blackmore Vale. The parish is one of the largest in Dorset. In the 2011 census the parish had 611 dwellings, 564 households and a population of 1,474.

In 1905 Sir Frederick Treves described Motcombe as "a hamlet of gardens at the foot of the hill" and wrote of the village houses that they "are facing all ways, as if they were shy of the road or were undecided which way to turn." The parish church of St Mary was rebuilt in 1846, although its font dates from Norman times.

On the south-west edge of the village is Motcombe Park. Within the park is Motcombe House, built in 1893 in Tudor style, and now home to Port Regis, a large private preparatory school.

Motcombe is within the Motcombe and Ham electoral ward, which also covers Ham, a neighbourhood of Gillingham to the west. The ward's population in the 2011 census was 3,216. The nearest railway station is at Gillingham, although the line itself cuts through the outskirts of the village.
