= Sebastian Conran =

British designer (born 1956)

- Born: Sebastian Orby Conran; April 5, 1956 (age 70); London, England
- Education: Bryanston School; Central Saint Martins College of Art and Design
- Occupations: Designer; Entrepreneur; Inventor
- Known for: Founder of Sebastian Conran Associates; Founder of Universal Expert; Founder of Consequential Robotics; Founder of Indusiviti; Chairman of Conran & Partners; Chairman of Conran Foundation
- Partner: Georgina Godley
- Parents: Terence Conran (father); Shirley Conran (mother)
- Relatives: Jasper Conran (brother); Sophie Conran (half-sister)

Sebastian Orby Conran (born 5 April 1956) is a British designer, entrepreneur and inventor.

== Early life ==
Sebastian Conran was born in London, the son of British designer, restaurateur and retailer Terence Conran and Superwoman author Shirley Conran née Pearce. He is the elder brother of fashion designer Jasper Conran and half brother of Tom, Sophie Conran and Ned.

He was educated at Bryanston School in Dorset, England, where he became a governor and trustee in 2011. He studied industrial design engineering at the Central School of Art and Design in London from 1974 to 1977. From 1976 to 1977, he worked as a general factotum and roadie with Punk band The Clash, designing clothes, posters, promotional material, record sleeves and stage sets.

== Design career ==
On graduating in 1978, Conran joined corporate and brand identity consultancy Wolff Olins. Three years later he became head of product design at Mothercare.

He established product and brand development consultancy Sebastian Conran Associates in 1985. From 1999, he headed product and branding design at Studio Conran under Conran & Partners, part of the Conran Group led by his father Sir Terence Conran. In 2009, he re-established the design company Sebastian Conran Associates as managing director, based in west London.

In 2009, Conran co-founded homewares brand Universal Expert for the design and international supply of homewares collections. He has separately collaborated with cooks like Nigella Lawson and Ken Hom to create their own homewares brands and designed products for department store chain John Lewis.

Other clients have included home appliance company Belling, retailers Marks & Spencer and Sainsbury's, Ford Motor Company and luxury goods company Connolly Leather, among others.

In 2014, he co-founded and became chief executive officer of Consequential Robotics with Professor Tony Prescott and Dr Ben Mitchinson of the University of Sheffield, which brings Sheffield together with the universities of Bristol and Edinburgh.

In 2015, he co-founded robotics wheelchair start-up Indusiviti and remains design director.

Since the death of his father in 2020, Conran has been chairman of multidisciplinary design group Conran & Partners and the Conran Foundation, a charity set up in 1980 to promote public education in design as a way of boosting quality of life.

In 2025, Conran was among 35 UK designers to sign a letter to the Department for Science, Innovation and Technology secretary Peter Kyle urging the government to reconsider its plans to allow artificial intelligence companies to train their models on copyrighted works without permission.

== Patents ==
Sebastian Conran holds more than 55 patents, primarily in design and consumer products. His patents cover a range of innovations, including

1. Dispenser Design (US$430764S) - A design patent focused on a streamlined dispenser for various consumer products, blending functionality with modern aesthetics.
2. Carafe with Flared Base (US$493059S1) - A carafe designed with an emphasis on stability and ease of handling, which features a distinctive flared base for ergonomic benefits.
3. Chopping Board (US$498123S1) - A unique chopping board that incorporates specific design elements aimed at improving utility in the kitchen, with innovative features for easy handling and cleaning.
4. Kitchen Equipment (US6035771A) - This utility patent encompasses a suite of kitchen tools with enhanced usability, including improvements in design for better user comfort and operational efficiency.
5. Percolator (US$464522S1) - A coffee percolator design that focuses on both visual appeal and practical function, optimized for ease of use and efficient brewing.
6. Mixer Design (US$391804S) - An ornamental design for a kitchen mixer that combines a sleek aesthetic with practical enhancements for optimal mixing performance.

. These patents reflect Conran's expertise in combining functionality with aesthetics.

== Academic career ==
From 1995 to 1998, Sebastian Conran was visiting lecture in the Furniture department of London's Royal College of Art. From 2008 to 2012, he was visiting professor in the Innovation faculty of University of the Arts London, and from 2011 to 2017 was Designer in Residence in the Engineering faculty of the University of Sheffield. In 2017, he was appointed visiting professor of Design and Innovation at Bristol Robotics Laboratory.

== Academic awards ==
Sebastian Conran has been awarded the following academic honours:

- Fellow of the Institute of Minerals, Materials and Mining
- Fellow [hon] of the Royal College of Art
- Fellow [hon] of University of the Arts London
- Fellow [hon] of Arts University Bournemouth
- Hon DEng from The University of Sheffield, 2012 Doctor of Technology [hon] from University of Loughborough
- PhD Design [hon] from UWE Bristol
- PhD Arts [hon] from Hertfordshire University

== Honorary roles ==
Sebastian Conran is a trustee of the Design Museum in London. and from 2005 to 2009 was a Trustee of educational charity Design and Art Direction.

From 2008 to 2011 he was a Trustee of the UK Design Council Design Council.

He chaired the Design & Technology Alliance, set up by the UK Government to tackle crime through design, from 2007 to 2011 and Innovate UK's Technologies Innovation Network from 2008 to 2014. He also chaired Innovate UK's Design Special Interest Group from 2013 to 2016.

From 2012 to 2016, he chaired the steering committee of Design in Action Scotland.

== Professional organisations ==
Sebastian Conran is a Fellow of Royal Society of Arts and of the Chartered Society of Designers.

== See also ==
- Robotic kitchen design
