= Terence Conran =

British restaurateur and designer (1931–2020)

Sir Terence Conran CH RDI FCSD
- Born: Terence Orby Conran; 4 October 1931; Kingston upon Thames, Surrey, United Kingdom
- Died: 12 September 2020 (aged 88); Kintbury, West Berkshire, United Kingdom
- Education: Bryanston School; Central Saint Martins College of Art and Design
- Occupations: Designer, restaurateur, retailer, writer
- Known for: Habitat
- Spouses: Brenda Davison (m. 1952; div. 1954); Shirley Pearce (m. 1955; div. 1962); Caroline Herbert (m. 1963; div. 1996); Victoria Davis (m. 2000)
- Children: 5, including Sebastian, Jasper and Sophie

Sir Terence Orby Conran CH RDI FCSD (4 October 1931 – 12 September 2020) was a British designer, restaurateur, retailer and writer. He founded the household retailer Habitat in 1964, and the Design Museum in Shad Thames, London, in 1989. The British designer Thomas Heatherwick said that Conran "moved Britain forward to make it an influence around the world".

Edward Barber, from the British design team Barber & Osgerby, described Conran as "the most passionate man in Britain when it comes to design, and his central idea has always been 'Design is there to improve your life.'" The satirist Craig Brown once joked that before Conran "there were no chairs and no France".

== Early life ==
Conran was born in Kingston upon Thames, Surrey, the son of Christina Mabel Joan Conran (née Halstead, d.1968) and South African-born Gerard Rupert Conran (d.1986), a businessman who owned a rubber importation company in East London. Conran was educated at Highfield School in Liphook, Bryanston School in Dorset and the Central School of Art and Design (now incorporated into Central St Martin's, a part of the University of the Arts, London), where he studied textiles and other materials.

== Work ==
Conran's first professional work came when he worked in the Festival of Britain (1951) on the main South Bank site. He left college to take up a job with Dennis Lennon's architectural company, which had been commissioned to make a 1/4-scale interior of a Princess Flying Boat. Shortly after the Festival ended, Conran was laid off and started focusing on furniture and fabric designs for David Whitehead. He worked with his friend Raymond Elston, who had some knowledge of welding and making clothes.

In May 1953, Conran, his friend Eduardo Paolozzi and Elston were invited to take part in the Third Weekend Exhibition of abstract art, organised by Adrian Heath in his studio at 22 Fitzroy Square, London. Conran showed some furniture: "a low table, a stool, a dining table and an upright chair - all in his familiar spindly-leg style"; Paolozzi some collages, and Elston some mobiles.

Conran started his own design practice in 1956 with the Summa furniture range and designing a shop for Mary Quant.

In 1964, he opened the first Habitat shop in Chelsea, London with his third wife Caroline Herbert, focusing on housewares and furniture in contemporary designs. Habitat grew into a large chain, the first retailer to bring such designs to a mass audience.

In the mid-1980s, Conran expanded Habitat into the Storehouse plc group of companies that included BhS, Mothercare and Heal's but in 1990 he lost control of the company.

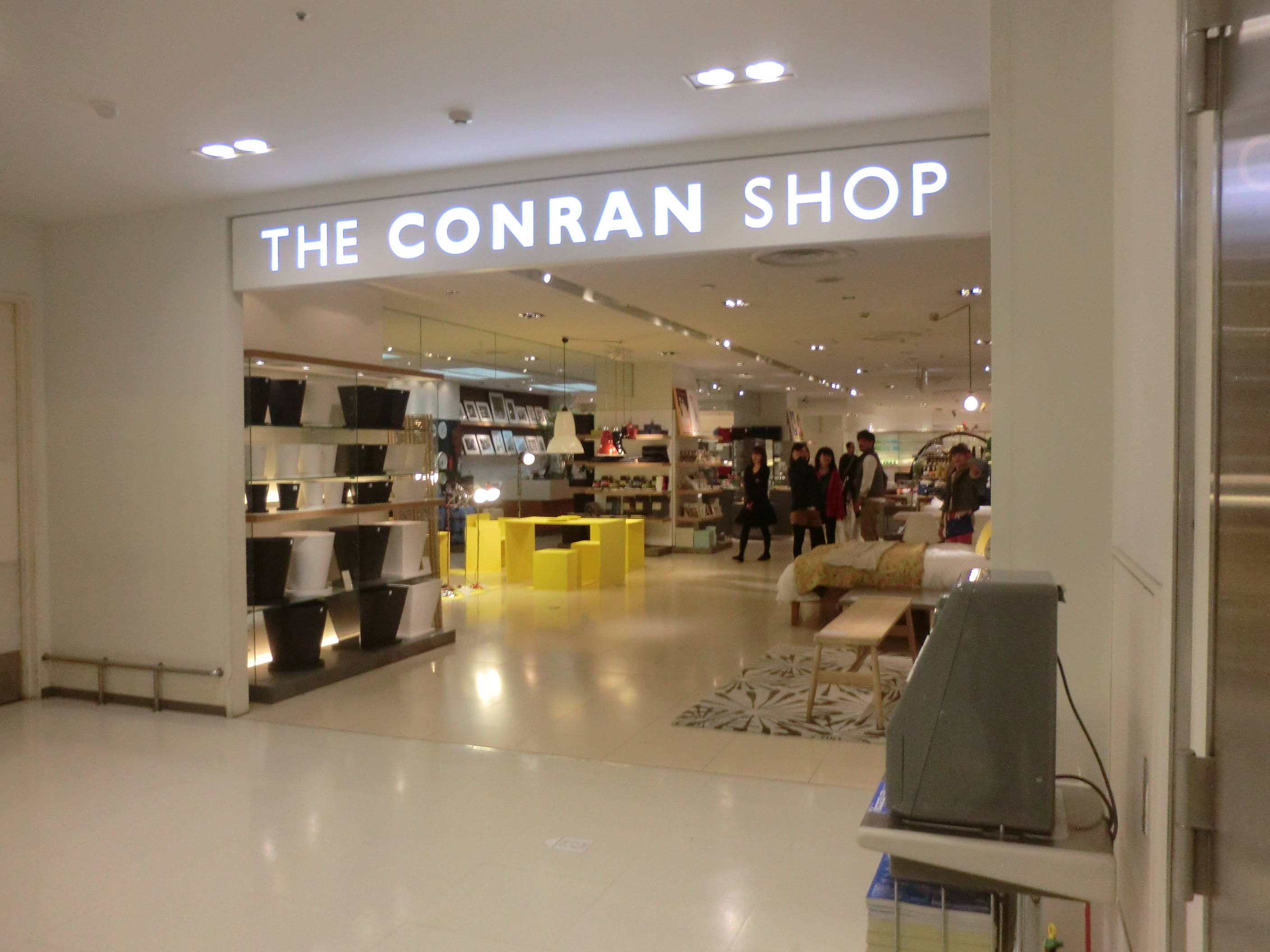
The Conran Shop Fukuoka at Tenjin area in Fukuoka, Japan

His later retail companies included the Conran Shop and FSC-certified (Forest Stewardship Council) wood furniture maker Benchmark Furniture, which he co-founded with Sean Sutcliffe in 1983.

He was also involved in architecture and interior design, including establishing the architecture and planning consultancy Conran Roche with Fred Roche in 1980. Their projects include Michelin House (which he turned into the restaurant Bibendum) and the Bluebird Garage, both in Chelsea. Conran had a major role in the regeneration in the early 1990s of the Shad Thames area of London next to Tower Bridge that included the Design Museum ( now relocated to Kensington ). His business, Conran and Partners, is a design company comprising product, brand and interior designers and architects, working on projects all over the world. Conran designed furniture for Marks & Spencer, J. C. Penney, Content by Conran, Benchmark, and The Conran Shop.

Conran's architecture and design practice also worked on projects in North America and Asia. In 2009, he licensed the Conran Shop to a partner in Japan. In September 2014, Cassina IXC Ltd acquired the entire business of The Conran Shop in Japan where it still thrives with four stores. In 2019, the Conran Shop opened in Seoul, South Korea.

In 1997, Conran appeared as himself in "In the Smoke", S5:E7 of Pie in the Sky.

=== Restaurants ===
Besides Bibendum, Conran, with Joel Kissin, created many other restaurants in London and elsewhere. In 2005, he was named as the most influential restaurateur in the UK by CatererSearch, the website of Caterer and Hotelkeeper magazine. In 2007, 49 percent of the restaurant business was sold to two former managers, who rebranded it as D&D London.

In 2008, he returned to the restaurant business on a personal basis by opening Boundary, a restaurant, bar, café, and meeting room complex in Shoreditch, East London. This was followed in 2009 by Lutyens, a restaurant and private club within the former Reuters building in Fleet Street London. In 2018, Lutyens, together with two other related restaurants, closed as Conran's hospitality venture with Peter Prescott went into administration.

=== Books ===
He wrote more than 50 books which broadly reflect his design philosophy, selling more than 25 million copies worldwide. The majority of these books were published by Conran Octopus, a division of Octopus Publishing Group, a cross-platform illustrated-book publisher founded by Conran and Paul Hamlyn.

=== Honours and awards ===
Conran was appointed Knight Bachelor in the 1983 New Year Honours and Member of the Order of the Companions of Honour (CH) in the 2017 Birthday Honours for services to design.

He was a winner of the Chartered Society of Designers Minerva Medal, the society's highest award.

Between 2003 and 2011, Conran was provost of the Royal College of Art. In 2003, he received the Prince Philip Designers Prize in recognition of his lifetime achievements in design.

In 2010, Conran was appointed a Royal Designer for Industry by the Royal Society of Arts. He won the Lifetime Achievement Award at The Catey Awards in 2017.

In 2019, Conran was presented with a Lifetime Achievement Award by The Furniture Makers’ Company, the City of London livery company and charity for the furnishing industry.

==== Academic honours ====
In 2007, he received an honorary degree from London South Bank University and, in August 2012, an honorary doctorate from the University of Pretoria.

In May 2012, he received an honorary professorship from the University for the Creative Arts.

== Personal life ==
Conran married architect Brenda Davison in 1952 at the age of 19; the marriage lasted six months. Conran married his second wife, journalist Shirley Pearce, in 1955 with whom he had two sons – Sebastian and Jasper – before they divorced in 1962. Conran married his third wife, cookery writer Caroline Herbert, the following year. The marriage lasted for 33 years and produced three children – Tom, Sophie, and Edmund – before ending in divorce in 1996. Conran married his fourth wife, Victoria Davis, in 2000.

== Death ==
Sir Terence Conran died on 12 September 2020, at the age of 88.

== Bibliography ==
- The House Book. Pub. Mitchell Beazley, 1974. ISBN 0855330414.
- The Kitchen Book. Crown Publishers, 1977.
- The Bed and Bath Book. Crown Publishers, 1978. ISBN 0-517-53399-5.
- The Cook Book. with Caroline Conran. Crown Publishers, 1980. ISBN 0517540185,.
- The Vegetable Book. Crescent, 1984. ISBN 0517446456.
- Terence Conran's New House book. Villard Books, 1985. ISBN 0-394-54633-4.
- Terence Conran's plants at home. with Susan Conder. Conran Octopus, 1986. ISBN 1-85029-056-3.
- Terence Conran's France. with Pierrette Pompon Bailhache, Maurice Croizard. Little, Brown, 1987. ISBN 0-316-15327-3.
- Terence Conran's Home Furnishings. 1987. ISBN 5-551-98206-8.
- Terence Conran's do-it-yourself with style. Simon & Schuster, 1989. ISBN 0671687190.
- Tableware. with Jeremy Myerson, Sylvia Katz. Pub. Van Nostrand Reinhold, 1990.
- Conran's Decorating with Plants. Smithmark Pub, 1990. ISBN 0-8317-2169-3.
- Terence Conran's garden style, with John McGowan. Ed. Roger DuBern. Crown Publishers, 1991. ISBN 0517584638.
- The Soft furnishings book. Conran Octopus, 1995.
- The French Room: Simple French Style for Your Home. with Elizabeth Wilhide. Conran Octopus, 1995. ISBN 1-85029-825-4.
- Terence Conran on design. Conran Octopus, 1996. ISBN 1-85029-771-1.
- The Essential Garden Book (Co-authored with Dan Pearson), Three Rivers Press, 1998. ISBN 0-609-80022-1.
- Terence Conran's Easy Living. Soma Books, 1999. ISBN 1-57959-045-4.
- Terence Conran on restaurants. Overlook Press, 2000. ISBN 1585670456.
- Terence Conran Small Spaces. Clarkson N Potter Publishers, 2001. ISBN 5-559-43946-0.
- Kitchens: the hub of the home. Clarkson Potter/Publishers, 2002. ISBN 0-609-61052-X.
- Bathrooms: just add water. Conran Octopus, 2004. ISBN 1-84091-357-6.
- Designers on Design. with Max Fraser. Collins Design, 2005. ISBN 0060834102.
- The Ultimate House Book: For Home Design in the Twenty-First Century. Ed. Elizabeth Wilhide. Pub. Conran Octopus, 2006. ISBN 1-84091-468-8.
- The Conran Cookbook. with Simon Hopkinson, Caroline Conran. Conran Octopus, 2007. ISBN 1-84091-496-3.
- How to live in small spaces: design, furnishing, decoration, detail for the smaller home. Pub. Conran Octopus, 2007. ISBN 1-84091-473-4.
- Storage: Get Organized. Conran Octopus, 2007. ISBN 1-84091-434-3.
- Chef's Garden: Fresh Produce from Small Spaces. Conran Octopus, 2008. ISBN 1-84091-510-2,.
- Terence Conran's Inspiration. with Stafford Cliff. Conran Octopus, 2009. ISBN 1-84091-494-7.
- Essential Colour. London: Conran Octopus Publishing, 2011, ISBN 978-1-84091-567-9.
- new edition Eco House Book. London: Conran Octopus Publishing, 2012, ISBN 978-1-84091-602-7.
- Plain, Simple, Useful: The Essence of Conran Style. London: Conran Octopus Publishing, 2014, ISBN 978-1-84091-655-3.

== Biographies ==
- Nicholas Ind, Terence Conran: The Authorised Biography, Sidgwick & Jackson, 1996. ISBN 0-283-06294-0.
- Elizabeth Wilhide, Terence Conran: Design and the Quality of Life, Watson-Guptill, 1999.
- Barty Phillips, Conran and the Habitat Story, ISBN 9780297784302
- Stephen Bayley & Roger Mavity, Terence: The Man Who Invented Design, Constable, 2021. ISBN 9781408715192

== See also ==
- List of alumni of the Central School of Art and Design
- List of English writers
- List of restaurateurs

== Other sources ==
- Fowler, Alan (2006), Constructivist Art in Britain 1913-2005, Winchester School of Art
- Grieve, Alastair (1990). "Towards an art of environment: exhibitions and publications by a group of avant-garde abstract artists in London 1951-55". The Burlington Magazine. 132, No. 1052 (November): 773–781.
- Grieve, Alastair (2005), Constructed Abstract Art in England After the Second World War: A Neglected Avant-Garde, Yale University Press, ISBN 978-0-300-10703-6
- Ind, Nicholas (1995). Terence Conran: The Authorised Biography. Sidgwick & Jackson. ISBN 0-283-06201-0.
