= Daniel Belling =

German politician (born 1986)

Member of the Landtag of Baden-Württemberg
- Incumbent
- Assumed office 18 May 2026

Personal details
- Born: 1986 (age 39–40)
- Party: Alliance 90/The Greens

Daniel Belling (born 1986) is a German politician serving as a member of the Landtag of Baden-Württemberg since 2026. He has served as spokesperson for Mittelstand policy and debureaucratization of the Alliance 90/The Greens group since 2026.
