= Reco Capey =

British artist and industrial designer

- Born: 1895
- Died: 1961 (aged 65–66)
- Education: Burslem School of Art, Royal College of Art
- Occupations: Artist, industrial designer
- Years active: 1924–1959
- Known for: Industrial design, painting, sculpture
- Notable work: Yardley packaging design, flower and honeybee motifs
- Spouse: Katharine Bertram (m. 1935)
- Awards: Fellow of the Royal Society of Arts (1934), Royal Designer for Industry (1937)

Reco Capey (1895–1961) was a British artist and industrial designer.

Capey studied art at Burslem School of Art, Stoke-on-Trent, Staffordshire, and then at the Royal College of Art from 1919 to 1922. He went on to become Chief Instructor of Design at that same school from 1924 to 1935.

Capey is perhaps best known for his work with the British cosmetics firm Yardley of London, where he served as Art Director from 1928 to 1959. During his tenure, Capey was responsible for the distinctive visual styling of Yardley's packaging with their flower and honeybee motifs. However, his wife, Katharine Bertram, whom he married in 1935 and who assisted him as a designer at Yardley, claimed to have designed the famous Yardley honeybee herself. Capey also controlled other areas of the company's brand image, including its store fittings and fixtures.

Capey was also active as an independent painter and sculptor. From 1929 to 1940, he exhibited at the Royal Academy and the Salon.

He was made a Fellow of the Royal Society of Arts in 1934.

In 1937 he was given the distinction ‘Royal Designer for Industry’ (RDI) by the Society.
