= Elizabeth Wilhide =

Elizabeth Wilhide is an author and novelist who has written extensively about design and decoration. Wilhide's first novel, Ashenden, was published by Penguin in June 2012. Her second novel, If I Could Tell You, was published by Fig Tree Penguin in February 2016. She was born in the United States and has lived in the United Kingdom since 1967. Wilhide currently resides in South London.

== Books ==
- Scandinavian Modern Home (2010) ISBN 978-1-84400-625-0
- Extraordinary Dogs (2009) ISBN 978-1-84949-000-9
- Small Spaces: Maximizing Limited Spaces for Living (2009) ISBN 978-1-906417-15-4
- The Interior Design Directory (2009) ISBN 978-1-84400-709-7
- New Decorating: With stylish, practical projects for every room (2008) ISBN 978-1-84091-330-9
- Surface and Finish (2007) ISBN 978-1-84400-508-6
- Converted: How to extend your home up, down and out (2007) ISBN 978-0-00-722940-6
- New Decor (2007) ISBN 978-0-7607-8944-5
- The Flooring Book: the essential sourcebook for planning, selecting and restoring floors (2005) ISBN 978-1-84172-998-5
- Light Your Home: A comprehensive guide to practical and decorative lighting (2005) ISBN 0-06-083307-6
- Eco: an essential sourcebook for environmentally friendly design and decoration (2004) ISBN 978-0-8478-2550-9
- The Ultimate House Book (2003), with Terence Conran ISBN 978-1-84091-352-1
- Materials (2003) ISBN 978-1-84400-042-5
- New Loft Living (2002) ISBN 978-0-7893-0818-4
- Bohemian Style (2001) ISBN 978-1-86205-433-2
- Materials: a directory for home design (2001) ISBN 978-1-56496-841-8
- Lighting: a design source book (2001) ISBN 978-1-84172-228-3
- Living with modern classics: the chair (2000) ISBN 978-0-8230-3109-2
- Sir Edwin Lutyens: designing in the English tradition (2000) ISBN 978-1-86205-589-6
- The Light: Living with Modern Classics (2000) ISBN 978-0-8230-3110-8
- The French Room (2000) with Terence Conran ISBN 978-1-85029-825-0
- The Millennium Dome with The Right Hon. Tony Blair (1999) ISBN 978-0-00-220170-4
- Terence Conran: design and the quality of life (1999) ISBN 978-0-500-01918-4
- William Morris: decor and design (1991) ISBN 978-1-86205-126-3
- The Mackintosh Style: Design and Decor (1998) ISBN 978-0-8118-1946-6
- Flowers for All Seasons: Winter (1989) with Jane Packer ISBN 978-0-449-90414-5
- Floors: a design sourcebook (1997) ISBN 1-55670-605-7
- Unique Interiors in Minutes (1993) with Stewart Walton ISBN 978-0-8019-8480-8
- Creating Space: Essential Home Organization (1998) ISBN 978-1-57959-001-7
- Terence Conran on design (1996) ISBN 0-87951-686-0
- Traditional Country Style: Inspirational ideas and practical tips for every room (1996) ISBN 978-0-7893-0068-3
- Ashenden (2013) ISBN 978-0241960004
- Design: The Whole Story (Editor) (2016) ISBN 978-0500292280
- If I Could Tell You (2016) ISBN 978-0241209615

== Critical reception ==
In a 1995 review in The New York Times, Michael Owens describes her "fully researched" book The Mackintosh Style: Design and Decor as "a keeper". Her book, Scandinavian Modern Home, was Book of the Week at the Evening Standard in September 2008.

An article written by Wilhide on tiles appeared in the Evening Standard at the same time as the publication of her book Surface & Finish.
