= Wood family =

English family of Staffordshire potters

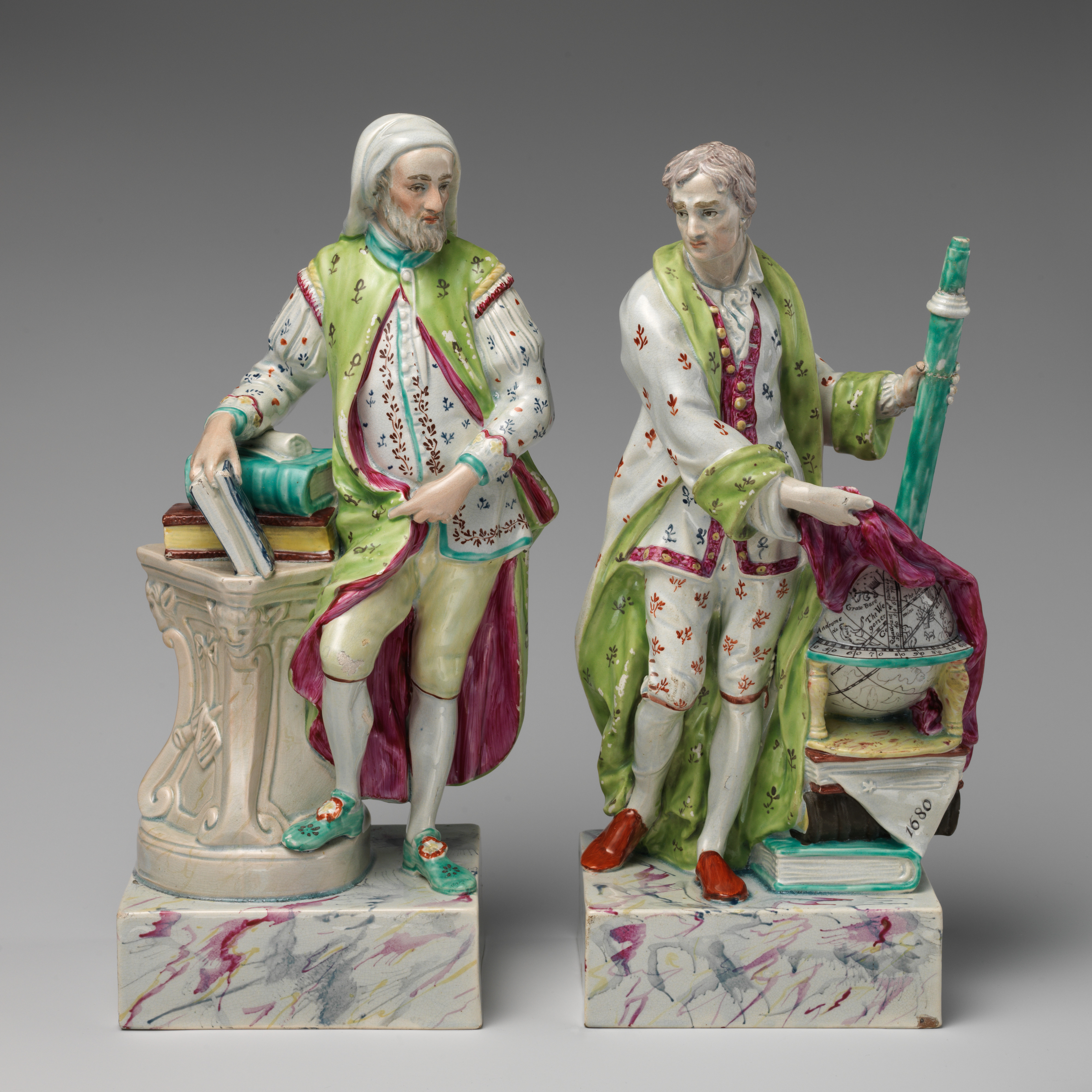
Staffordshire figures of Chaucer and Isaac Newton, Ralph Wood II, c. 1790. About 12 inches (30 cm) tall.

The Wood family was an English family of Staffordshire potters. Among its members were Ralph Wood I (1715–1772), the "miller of Burslem," his son Ralph Wood II (1748–1795), and his grandson Ralph Wood III (1774–1801). Ralph I was the brother of Aaron Wood, father of Enoch Wood. Through his mother, Ralph Wood II was related to Josiah Wedgwood.

The first two Ralphs were among the best modellers in Staffordshire pottery of their day, both mainly noted for their Staffordshire figures, as well as running successful "potbank" businesses. Their most popular figures continued to be produced well after their deaths, and were often imitated and copied by others. Aaron Wood was also an important modeller, but more noted for "useful" tablewares.

== Ralph Wood I ==
Ralph Wood I (1715–1772) was apprenticed to John Astbury in 1730, then worked with Thomas Whieldon at Fenton Low where he learned to make coloured glazes. In 1754 he started making his own salt-glazed wares at Burslem, and by about 1760 was creating ceramic figures of humans and animals, mostly famously stags. He is credited with introducing the Toby jug, with his first being "Toby Philpot" circa 1762. He supplied Wedgwood with some models.

Experts have become more cautious in attributing individual pieces to his pottery, and many are now described by terms such "Whieldon-type".

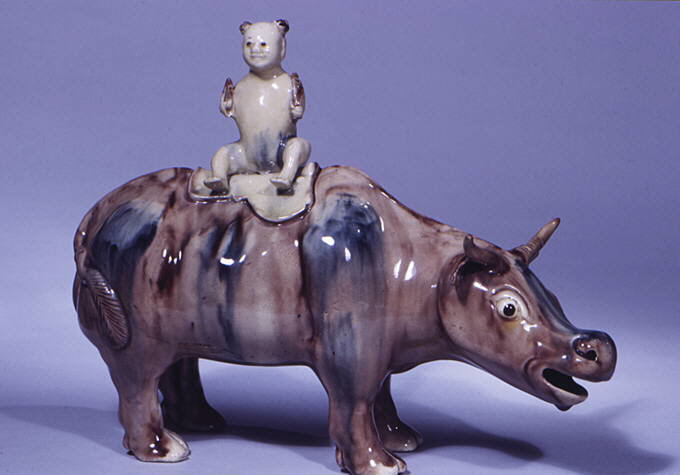
Water buffalo with boy, one of a pair, c. 1750, tortoiseshell ware

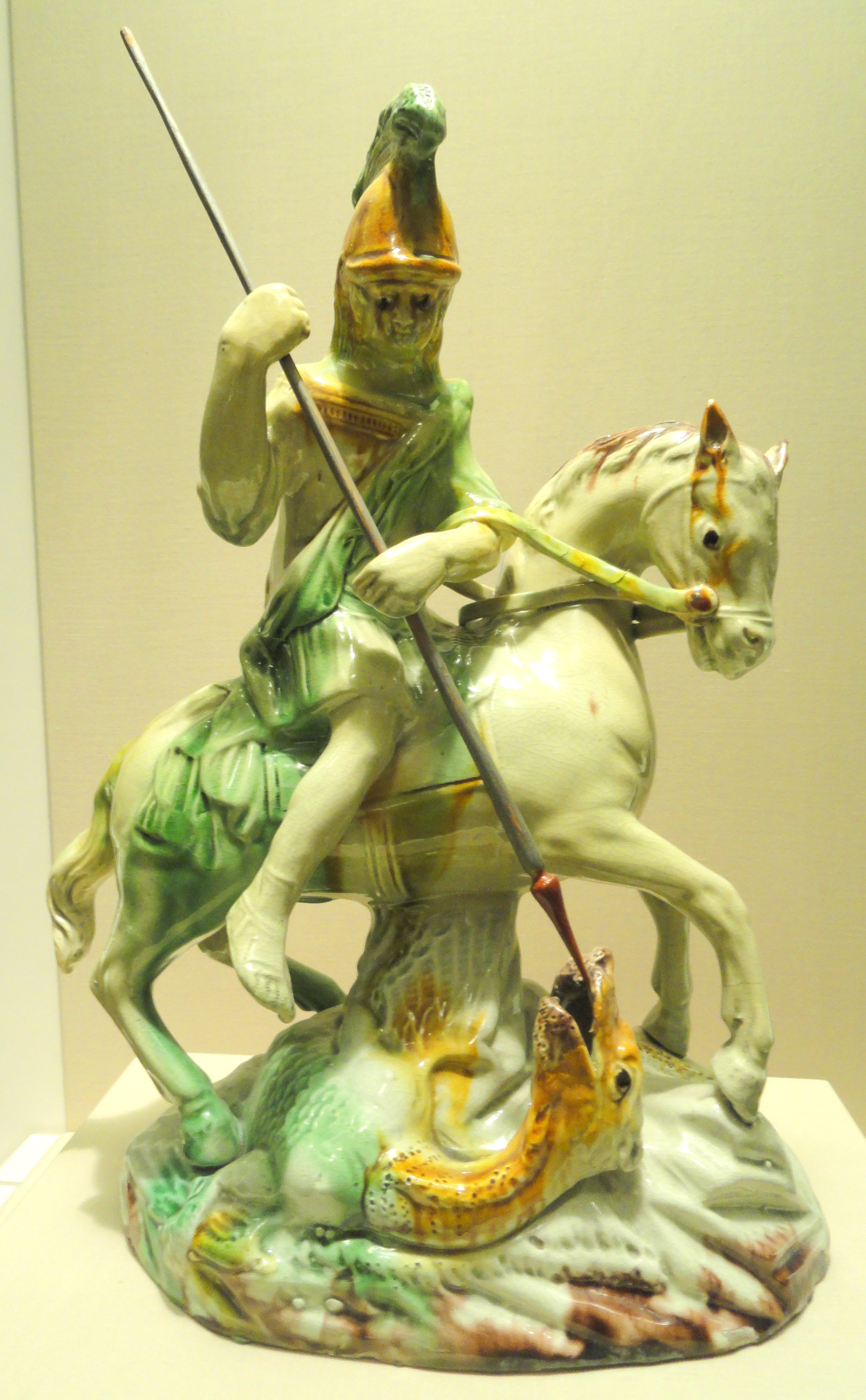
St. George and the Dragon, attributed, 1760s

== Ralph Wood II ==
Ralph Wood II (1748–1795) followed in his father's footsteps, manufacturing a variety of figures coloured with overglaze enamels; at least some were supplied to Josiah Wedgwood in 1782 and 1783. The details of his career have been the subject of considerable controversy in recent decades. From 1773 to 1781 he ran a shop in Bristol, whose assets were sold when he went bankrupt. His brother John worked with him, apparently running things in Burslem at least some of this time.

He also employed the mysterious figure of John Voyez, who Wedgwood had dismissed and then prosecuted either for theft of designs, or for being caught drawing the daughter of another employee in the nude (perhaps acceptable in France, but not in Staffordshire). In any case he received a prison sentence in Stafford Goal in 1769. Voyez seems to have been French and trained in some form of sculpture, and probably modelled many of the figures. His work is associated with "thick-lidded eyes, somewhat flattened noses, and a general roundness of contour", and "somewhat pugnatious facial details on almost all his figures, even those representing women".

On 24 June 1774, he married Sophia Lambert and their son, Ralph Wood III, was baptized on 29 May 1774.

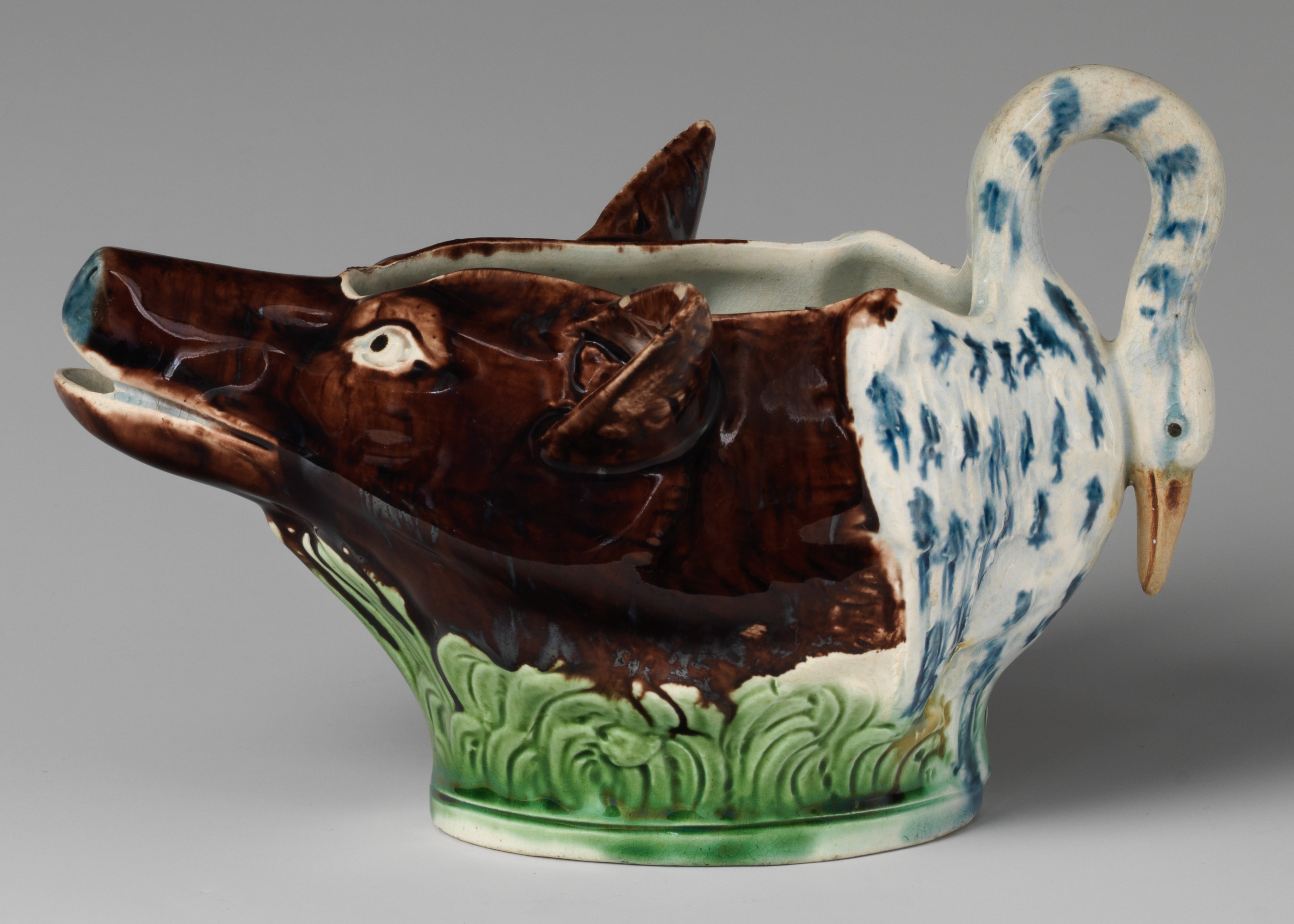
Fox and goose sauceboat, 1770s

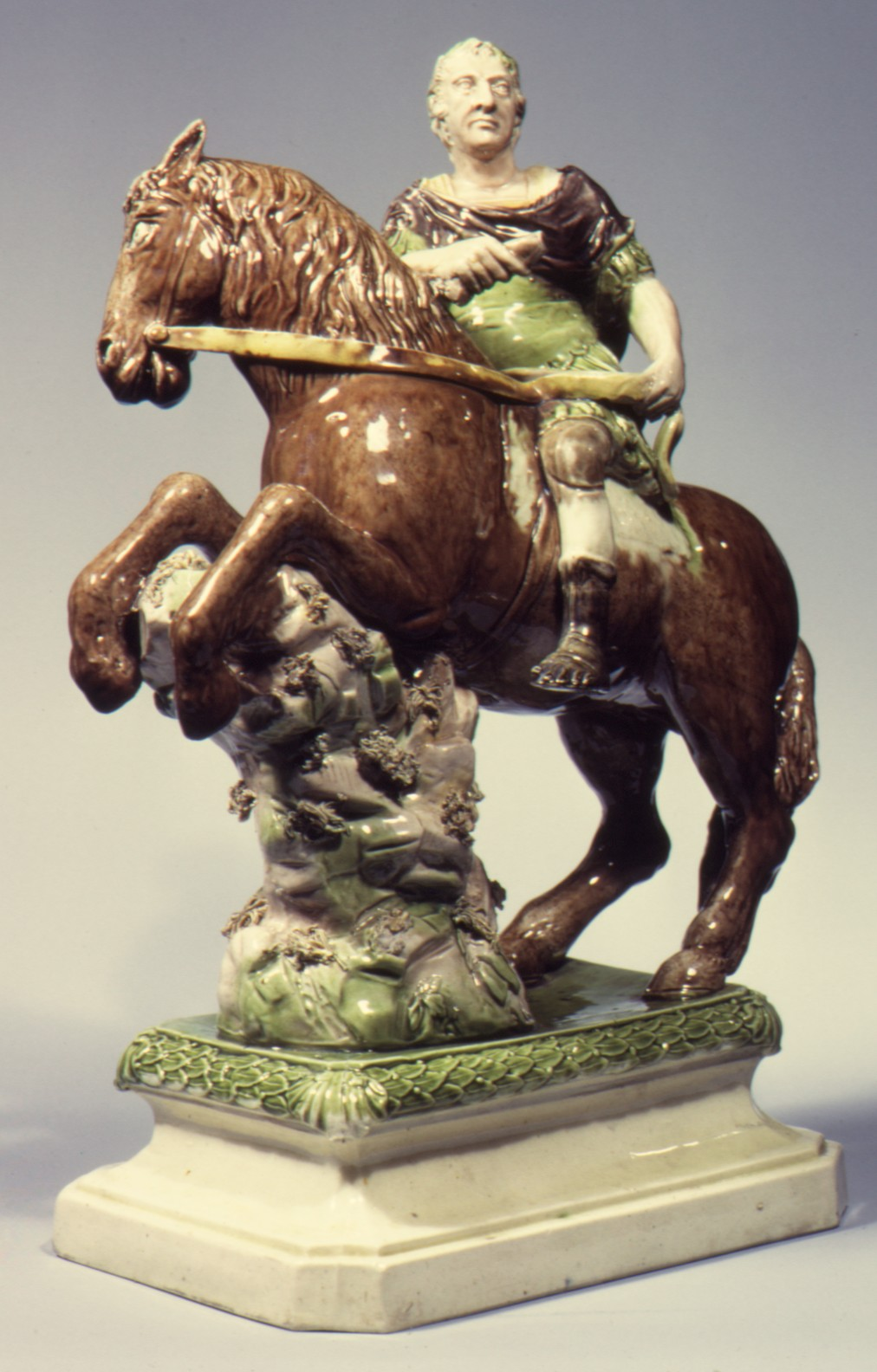
William III as a Roman emperor, 1770s. Lead-glazed earthenware, 14 inches

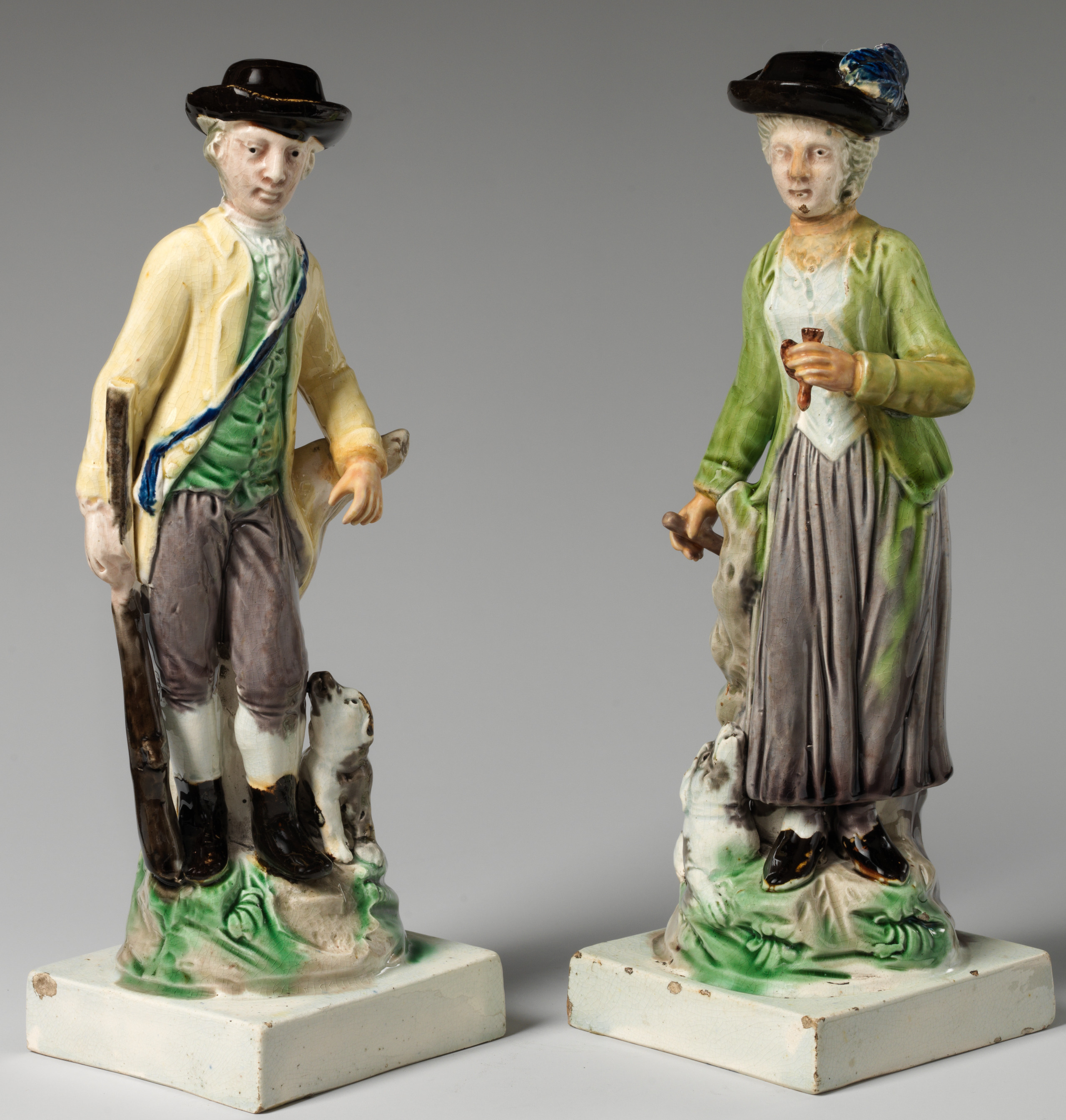
Sportsman and sportswoman, c. 1780

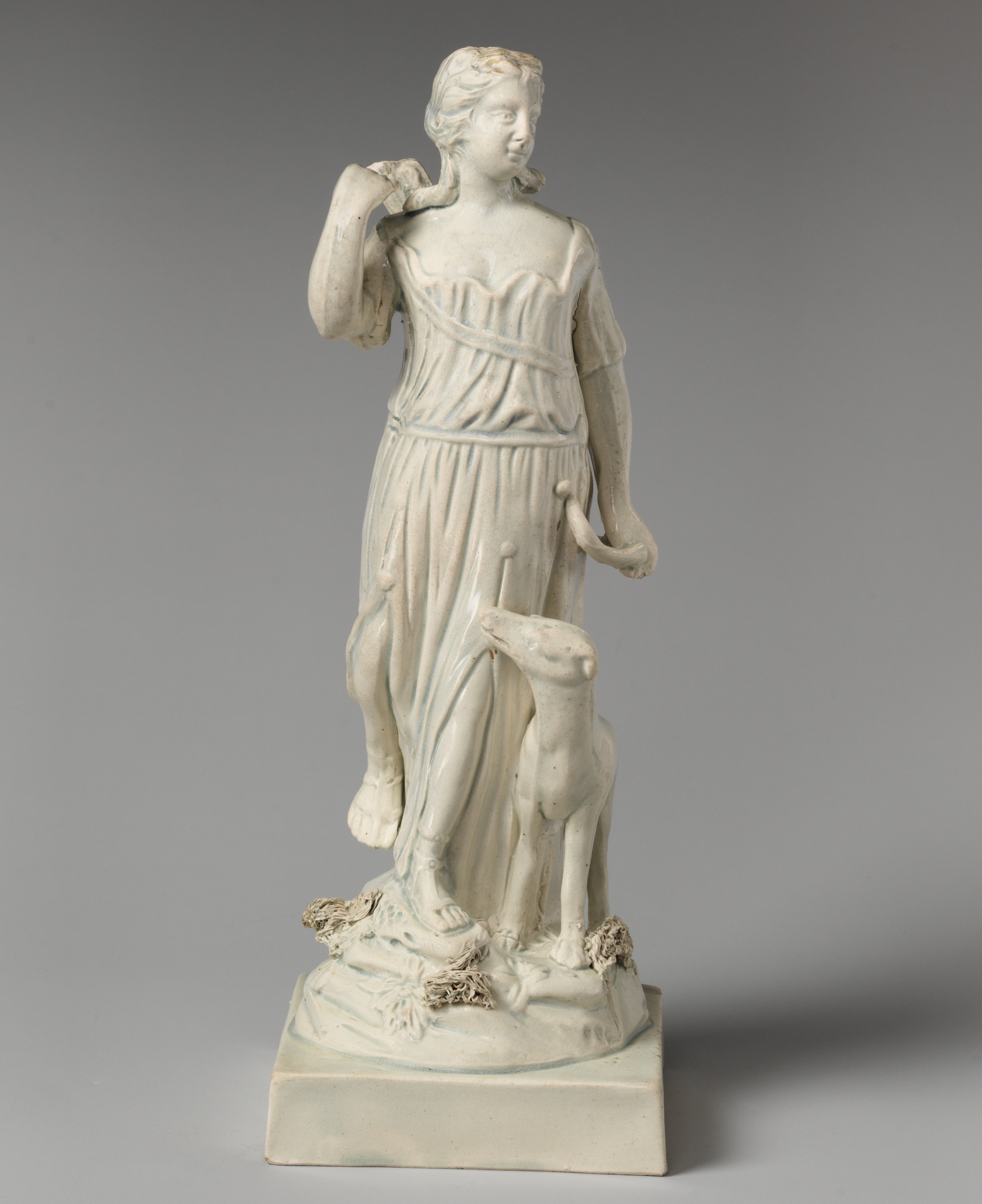
Diana with hound, 1780s

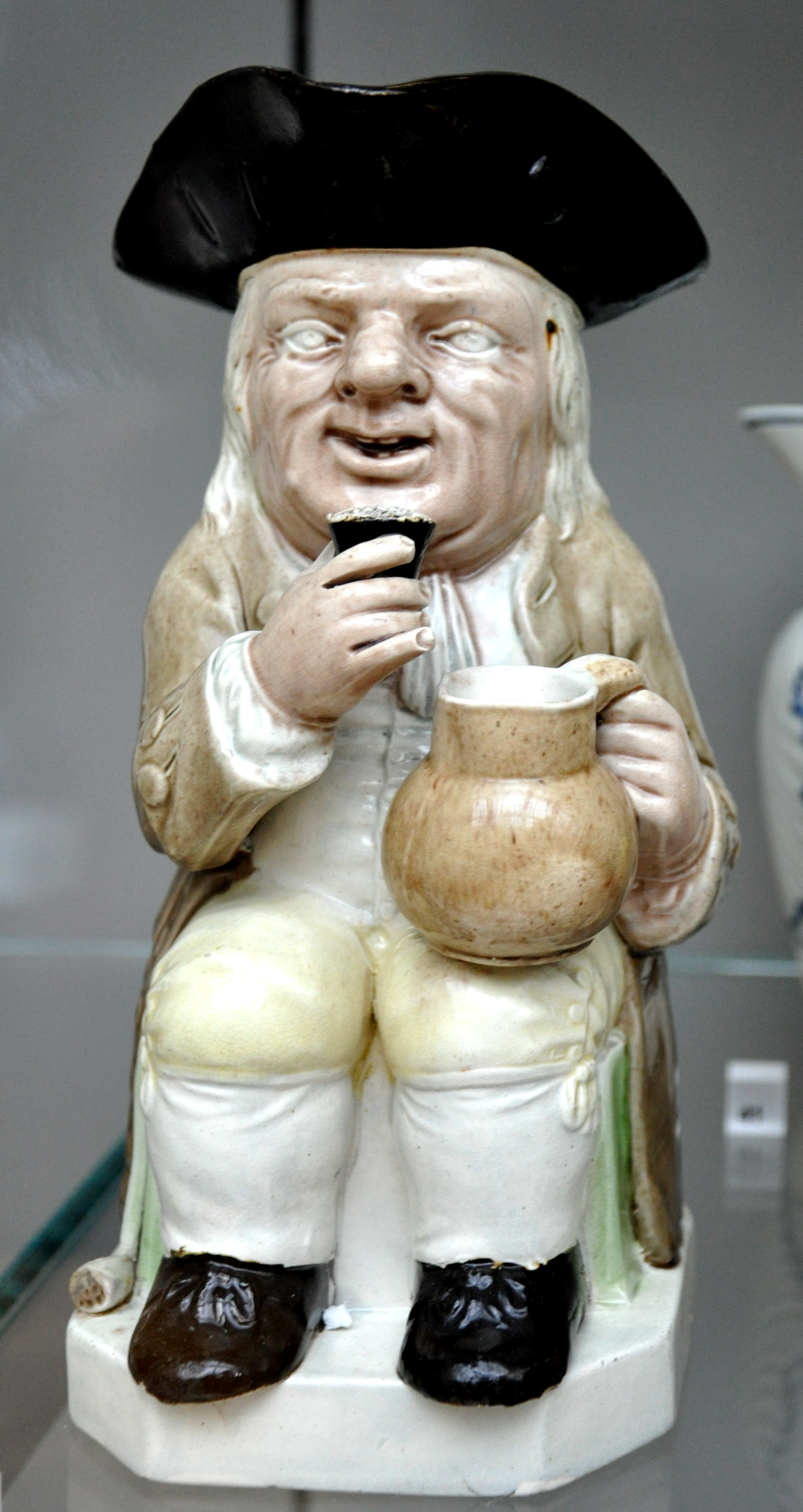
Pearlware Toby jug, c. 1782–1795

== Ralph Wood III ==
Ralph Wood III (1774–1801) continued the Hill Potworks until his early death in 1801, at which time production of Ralph Wood figures ceased. It is not clear if he modelled himself, or even introduced new figures.
