= Twyford Bathrooms =

Bathroom fixtures manufacturer based in England

- Type: Private (subsidiary of Geberit AG)
- Industry: Bathroom fittings
- Founded: 1849
- Founder: Thomas Twyford & Thomas William Twyford
- Headquarters: Alsager, Cheshire, England
- Products: Sanitaryware
- Website: www.twyfordbathrooms.com

Twyford Bathrooms is a manufacturer of bathroom fixtures based in Alsager, Cheshire, England.

== History ==
Thomas Twyford and his son Thomas William Twyford established what is now known as Twyford Bathrooms in 1849 in Bath Street, Hanley, Stoke-on-Trent. The worldwide demands for new sanitaryware soon required the building of an all new factory in 1887 at Cliffe Vale, Stoke-on-Trent. This was the first purpose built bathrooms factory in the world.

Today it is owned by Geberit AG, which is a European manufacturer of sanitation equipment, following the 2015 acquisition of Finland-based bath and toilet firm Sanitec for $1.4 billion.

In 1999, Twyford Bathrooms were made holders of the Royal Warrant of Appointment to Queen Elizabeth II.

== Timeline ==
1680: Joshua Twyford (1640-1729) was the first Twyford to make commercial pottery near Shelton Old Hall, Hanley, Stoke-on-Trent. Specimens of his work can be seen at the Potteries Museum in Hanley, Stoke-on-Trent, including a salt glazed stoneware teapot inscribed 'Sarah Twyford'.

1729: Joshua Twyford died. The precise date production ceased at Twyford's original factory is not known, but the Twyford family continued potting in the district with the possible lapse of a generation.

1827: Thomas Twyford was born.

1849: Thomas Twyford established two factories where washbasins and closet pans of an elementary nature were made. The first was his Bath Street Works in Hanley, Stoke-on-Trent. The factory still exists but the street has been renamed Garth Street. The second was his Abbey Works in Bucknall, Stoke-on-Trent. Twyford commenced exporting to America, Russia, Australia, France, Germany, Spain and many other countries.

1849, 23 September: Thomas William Twyford was born, in Hanover Street, Hanley, Stoke-on-Trent.

1870: The "Annus Mirabilis" of the water closet. 1870 was the start of thirty years of massive growth of the Twyford company and a flood of sanitary invention.

1872: Thomas Twyford died. Thomas William, at age 23, took over the running of the blossoming company.

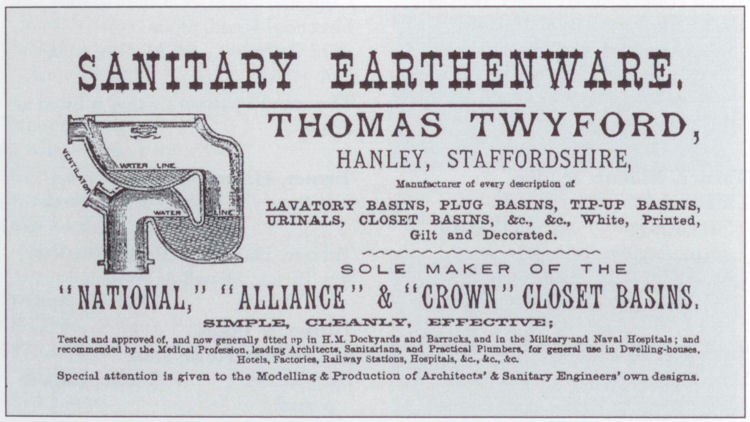
A Thomas Twyford advertisement, 1884

1883: Thomas William Twyford introduced the first all-ceramic, free-standing, one-piece, washout, pedestal closet, the Unitas. This incorporated the WC pan with an integral trap as one piece of pottery without the need for a surrounding wooden cabinet. The Unitas was exported throughout the world and the name itself is used to this day in the Russian language to mean "toilet" - see унитаз (Russian).

1887: Twyford's Cliff Vale factory was built as a "model" factory. The new factory's toilet facilities and systems of ventilation were treated by government inspectors of factories as a pattern for the whole of Staffordshire. Every workman had his own opening window.

1889: The first washbasins with combined overflows were introduced by Twyford.

1896: Twyford formed into a private limited company.

1901: Twyford built a factory in Ratingen, Germany, but vacated it in 1914 during the First World War. It was not reoccupied by Twyford but the Keramag company was established and produces sanitaryware at the factory to this day. Keramag is a member of the Sanitec Group.

1919: Twyford became a public limited company.

1921: Thomas William Twyford died. He was recognised as a leading pioneer in the application of principles of hygiene to sanitary appliances. He became known as the "father of British bathrooms."

1929: A silent, black-and-white movie film showing the sanitaryware processes was commissioned as a marketing tool by the new Twyford management.

1945: Reconstruction of Etruria Works started and the first tunnel kilns were installed.

1953: The Cliffe Vale Fireclay factory was reconstructed, having suffered bomb damage during World War II.

1956: Construction at Alsager, Cheshire, of a vitreous china factory was started on a 52-acre (21 ha) site. The first stage was completed in 1958.

1960: Twyford commenced manufacture of vitreous china in India, with Hindustan Sanitaryware & Industries Limited.

1962: Twyford established a factory in Port Elizabeth, South Africa.

1970: Twyford commenced manufacture of vitreous china in a new factory located in Melbourne, Australia.

1971: Twyford acquired by the Building Products division of Reed International.

1973: Reed International acquires Curran Steels, adding its pressed steel and acrylic baths to the Twyford product range.

1976: A£5 million expansion scheme for the Alsager vitreous china factory was completed.

1992: MB Caradon invested £13 million in a new national distribution centre and new head office, showroom and administrative block on the Alsager site, which became the largest single unit devoted to vitreous china production and distribution in Europe. The site at Alsager now covers 70 acres (28 ha).

1996: George Rimmer joined as Commercial Products Director and oversaw a joint venture with Bushboard promoting Twyford as a market leader in the UK commercial sector.

1999: Twyford's 150th birthday

2001, January: HSBC sold Twyford Bathrooms to the Sanitex Corporation of Helsinki, Finland. Sanitec is Europe's largest producer of ceramic sanitaryware in Europe and is quoted on the Helsinki stock exchange. Twyford Bathrooms was re-established with the Twyford, Doulton and Royal Doulton brands of bathroom products.

2001: Twyford introduced the first British-made, specially designed, valve operated toilet suite to the UK market, the View suite.

2005: Twyford's brand logo was redesigned.

2007: Twyford's Sola range was completely overhauled and the Rimless Pan was launched.

2007: Twyford Galerie Flushwise – the dual flush 4-litre and 2.6-litre water efficient suite – launched and won the Water Wise Marque award.

2010: The company's parent group Sanitec announced the closure of the Alsager factory in July 2010, with all manufacturing moving to factories outside the UK.

2011: Production halted after 162 years. The factory in Alsager, Stoke-on-Trent was closed to make way for a supermarket; however, the offices remain.

2012: Planning permission for a supermarket was refused due to the impact on surrounding businesses. In October 2012 Twyford's Bath Street Works in Hanley, Stoke-on-Trent was finally demolished. On 28 December 2012 Twyford's Garner Street "Etruria Works" sustained an enormous fire, with many of the businesses in the last original Twyford's industrial units being affected.
