= Elers brothers =

John Philip Elers
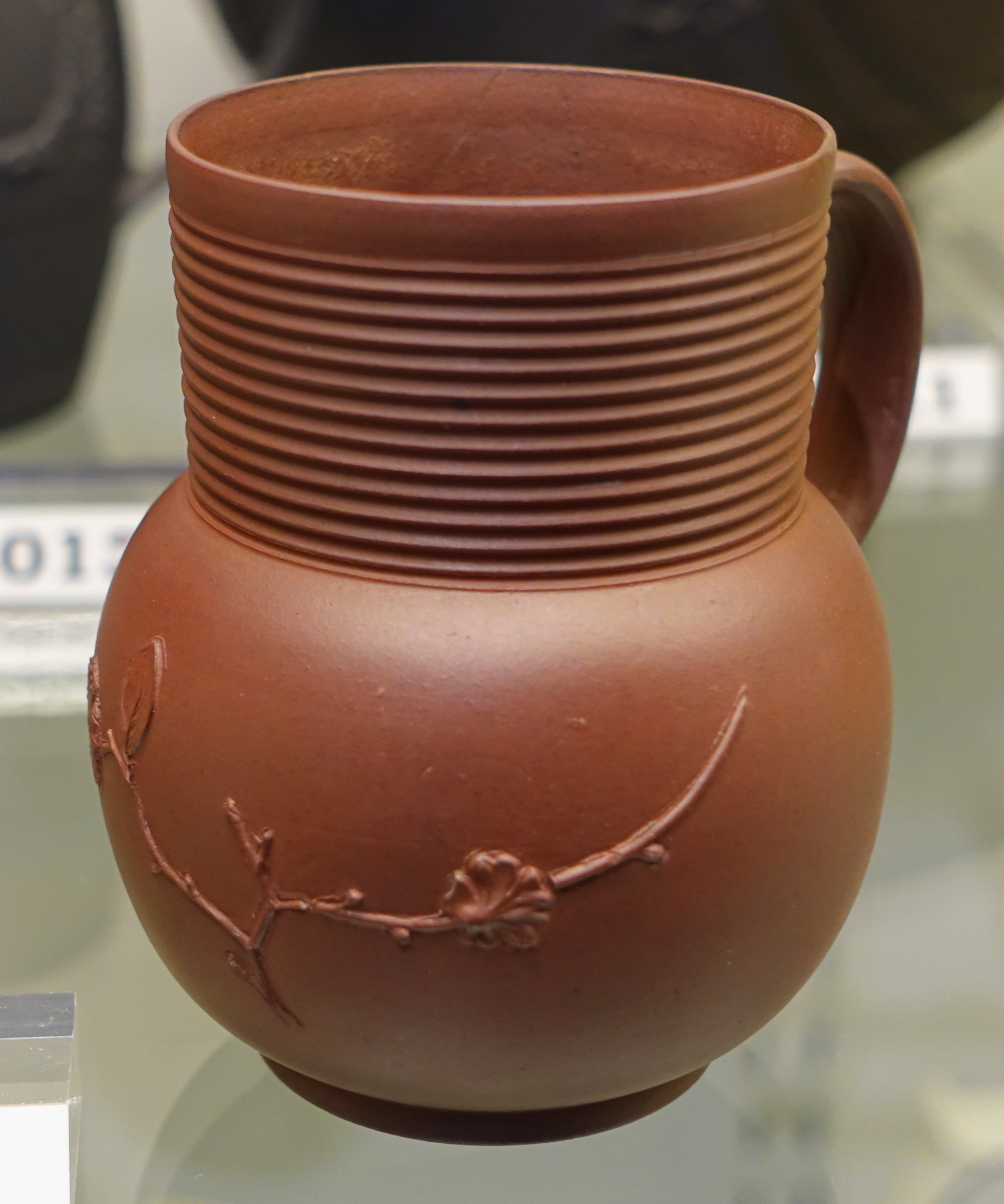
- Mug, 1693-98, with Chinese-style prunus-blossom sprigging
- Born: 7 September 1664; Utrecht
- Died: 1738 (aged 73–74); Dublin
- Occupation: Potter

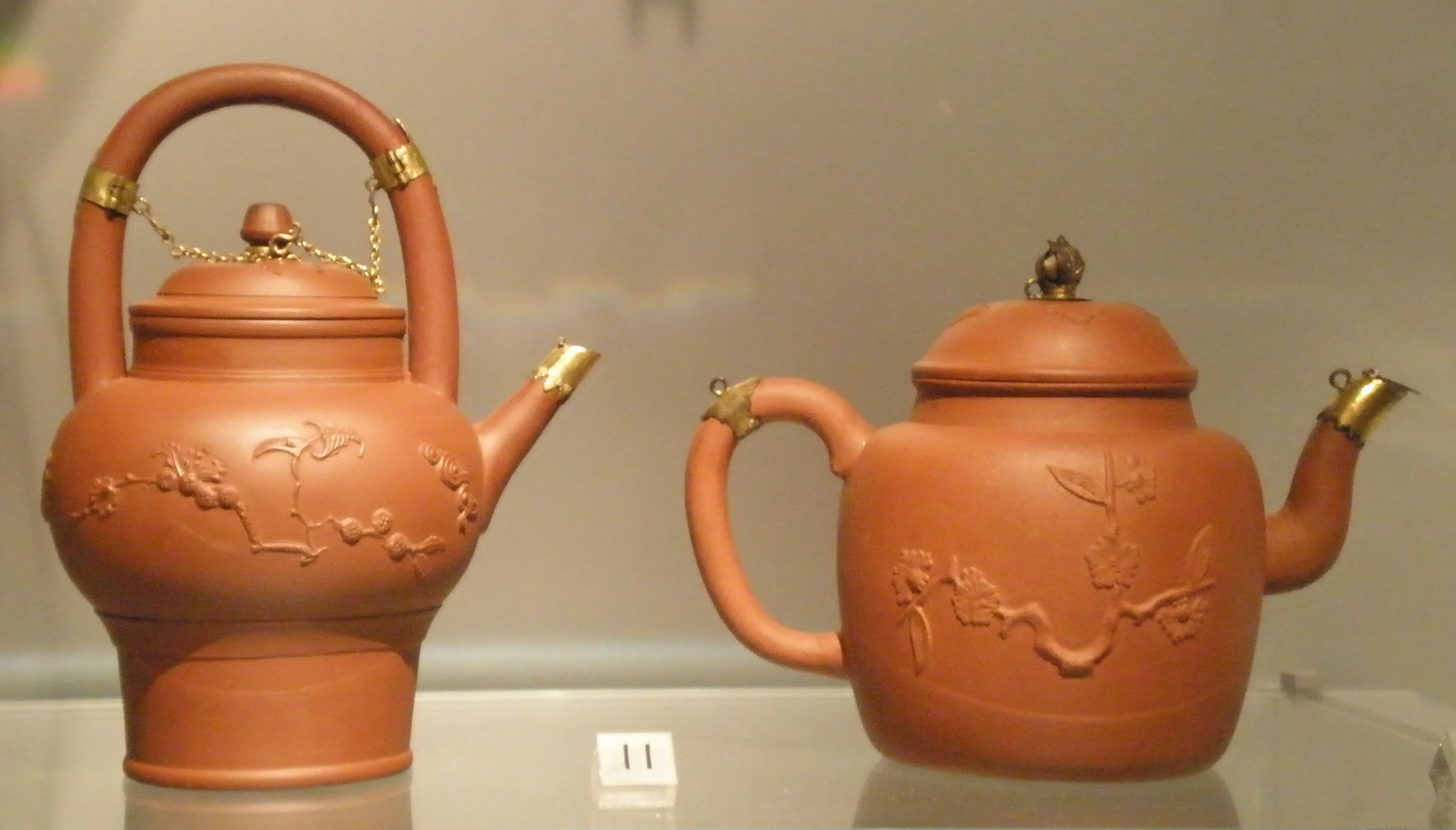
Two teapots: left by the Elers; right, Chinese Yixing ware of 1627.

John Philip Elers (7 September 1664 – 1738) and his brother David Elers were Dutch silversmiths who came to England in the 1680s and turned into potters. The Elers brothers were important innovators in English pottery, bringing redware or unglazed stoneware to Staffordshire pottery. Arguably they were the first producers of "fine pottery" in North Staffordshire, and although their own operations were not financially successful, they seem to have had a considerable influence on the following generation, who led the explosive growth of the industry in the 18th century.

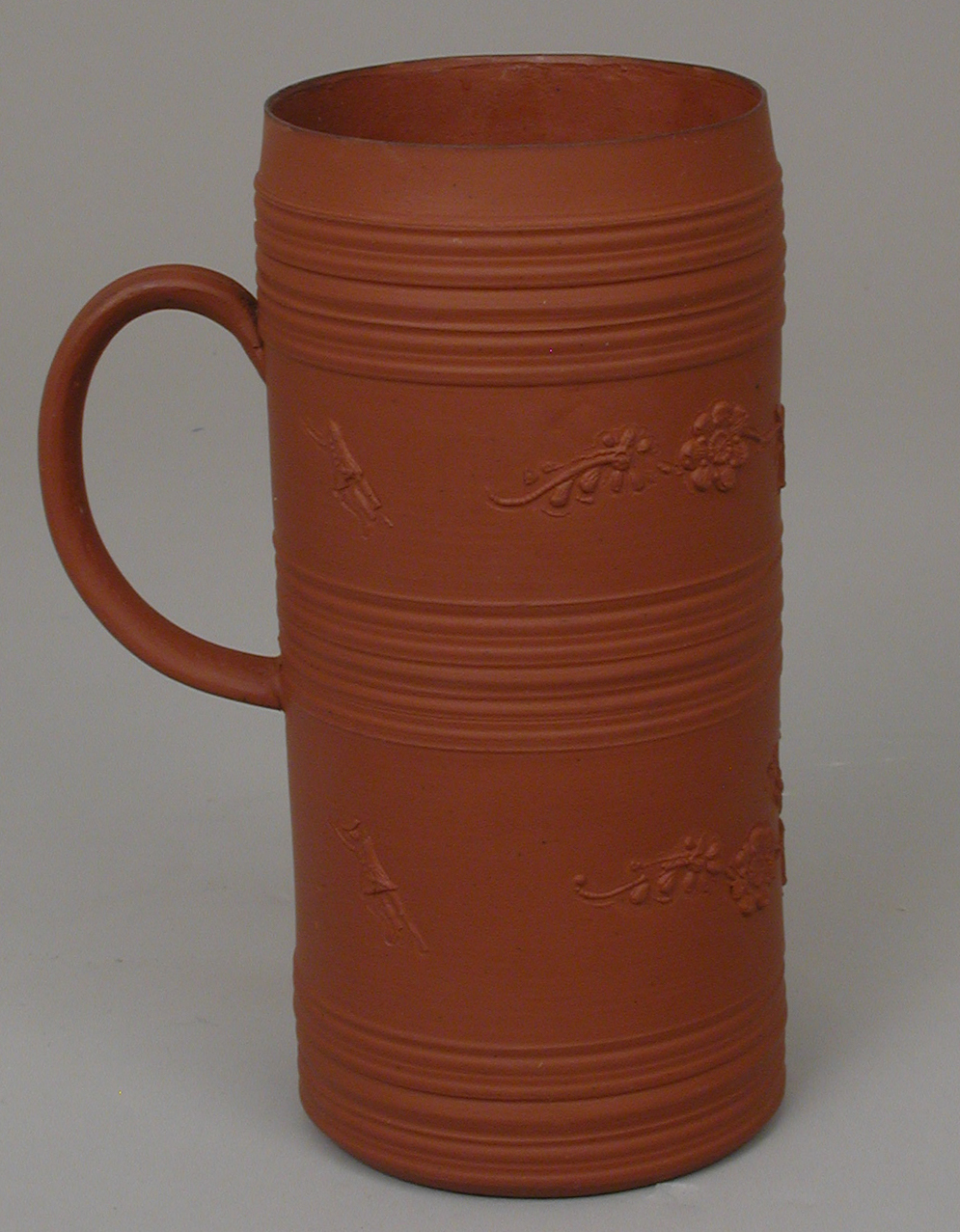
Elers Brothers mug, 1690s

== Early life and education ==
John Philip Elers was born in Utrecht in 1664, the son of Martin Elers, a German living in Amsterdam, who married in 1650 a daughter of Daniel van Mildert; he had a sister married to Sir William Phipps, and a brother David. There was an uncle selling ceramics in London, and Martin Elers was involved in that business from the mid-1670s. John Philip Elers and his brother had some technical training in Cologne, and then are thought to have moved to England in the 1680s.

== Career ==
The Elers brothers came to England in the 1680s. After moving to London, David was still recorded working as a silversmith in London in 1686. By about 1690, the brothers were in business in Fulham, making stoneware. They discovered a fine red clay at Bradwell in Staffordshire, which was very suitable for producing redware in imitation of Yixing ware, the Chinese red pottery, which the East India companies imported into England. According to one Chinese scholar it was "even finer than the clay used at Yixing".

Around 1690, John Philip Elers settled in Bradwell Wood, near Burslem, a secluded spot, where he established a factory. The products were stored in Dimsdale, about a mile away, and the buildings were said to be connected by a speaking tube; the pottery was sold by David Elers in London, at his shop in the Poultry.

Their speciality was a red unglazed pottery, chiefly teapots, with sprigged relief ornament mostly in Chinese styles. Like earlier Dutch stoneware, their teapots, one of their most common lines, were heavily influenced by Chinese Yixing ware, also unglazed stoneware mostly used for teawares. The vessel shapes often also drew from European silversmithing. Some pieces, like the teapot in the Victoria & Albert Museum illustrated, have imitation Chinese characters, usually described as "imitation Chinese seal marks" by scholars. Yixing teapots had been reaching Europe over recent decades.

It is now accepted that they used slipcasting for all their wares, even the round shapes which would have been easy to pot on a wheel. This increased their costs, and so their selling prices, and probably led to the financial failure of the business. They were important innovators in this, probably drawn to the technique by their experience of making pewter objects by casting, which was the standard technique for forming that material. A letter later written to Paul Elers, son of John Philip, by Josiah Wedgwood, mentioned the brothers making ware "by casting it in plaster moulds and turning it upon the outside by lathes"; this was dismissed as "astounding" by the Rheads, but research in recent decades has shown it to be correct.

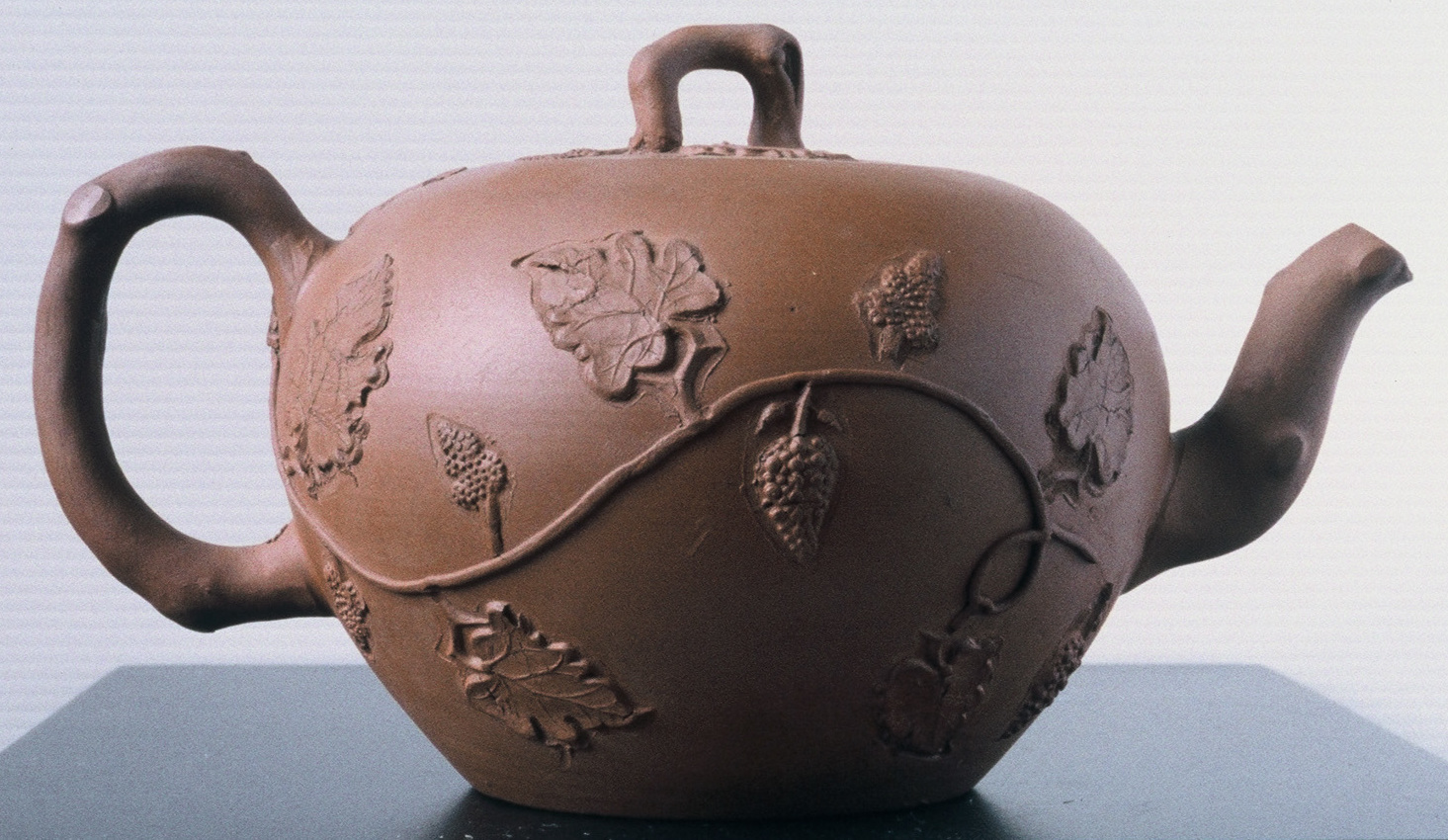
Later(?) teapot with sprigged vine decoration

Simeon Shaw, in his work History of the Staffordshire Potteries (1829), made much of the commercial secrecy employed by the Elers brothers in their Burslem pottery; Shaw relied on local oral tradition. He wrote that they employed the stupidest workmen they could obtain; and an idiot to turn the wheel. At last Josiah Twyford and John Astbury discovered the secret, the latter by feigning idiocy.

The Elers brothers became the targets of legal action by John Dwight, also of Fulham, who had a monopoly of salt glazed stoneware. In the period from 1691 to 1693 they set up in Staffordshire, but also kept a London outlet, and a works in Vauxhall. Though archeological digs have not found any evidence of salt glazed shards under their workshop, they settled with Dwight by taking out a licence, that ran to 1698.

In 1698, John Philip gave up his lease on the Bradwell property, where he had also been a gentleman farmer, but the Vauxhall works continued until both brothers became bankrupt in 1700.

After Elers left Bradwell, he became connected with the glass manufactory at Chelsea, where he assisted in the manufacture of soft-paste porcelain. Subsequently he moved to Dublin, where he set up a glass and china shop.

== Personal life ==
Elers married Miss Banks, by whom he was father of Paul Elers, who was educated for the law, and married Mary, the daughter and heiress of Edward Hungerford of Blackbourton Court, Oxford. He died in 1781, aged 82, leaving by her, among other children, Maria, the wife of Richard Lovell Edgeworth, and mother of Maria Edgeworth, the novelist. There is a medallion portrait of John Philip Elers done by Wedgwood, from a painting in the possession of the family, and there are two small mezzotint portraits of Paul Elers and his wife, engraved from the life by Butler Clowes.

== Legacy ==
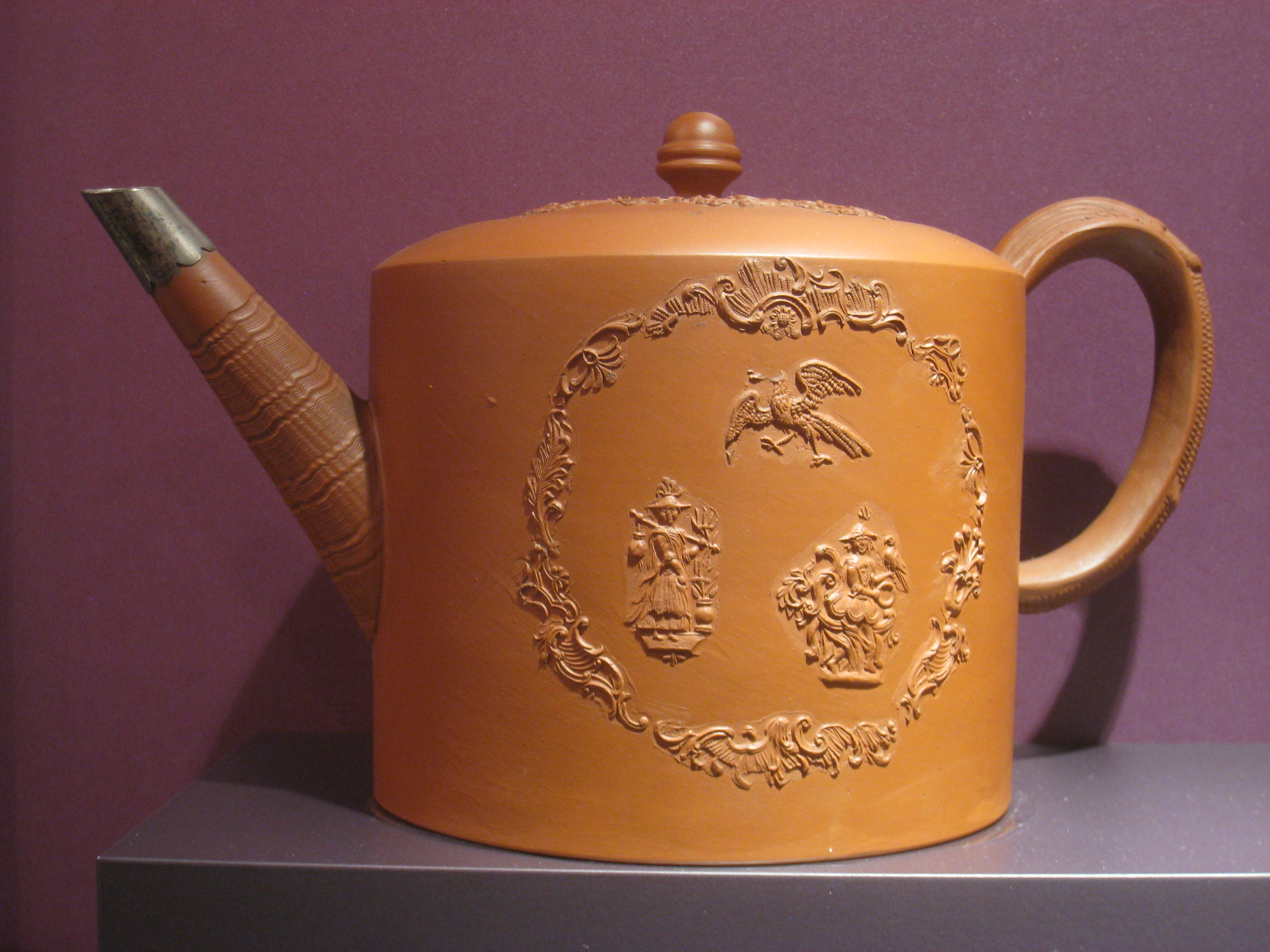
Style of Elers brothers, Staffordshire coffee-pot, 1750-75

The Elers brothers brought the techniques of lathe turning, slip casting and relief ornamenting to Staffordshire, which may have been the result of their experience as silversmiths or because of their knowledge of European pottery. Their revolutionary processes were not continued in 1698, but left to be rediscovered some 40 years later: In the 1730s their technique was revived and continued to the late 18th century. Fanciful shapes were press molded. From the 1740s ready-molded leaves were also used. The Elers had a considerable influence on the following generation, who led the explosive growth of the industry in the 18th century. The difficulty of distinguishing their wares from those of the many imitators who continued their broad style has long been recognised by scholars, but progress has been made, based on an understanding of their distinctive technique. The works of the imitators are often described as "Elers type", "style of Elers", and similar terms. Johann Friedrich Böttger, the European who eventually worked out how to make porcelain, was to make similar "Böttger ware" teaware before doing so.
