= SylvaC =

British ceramics brand

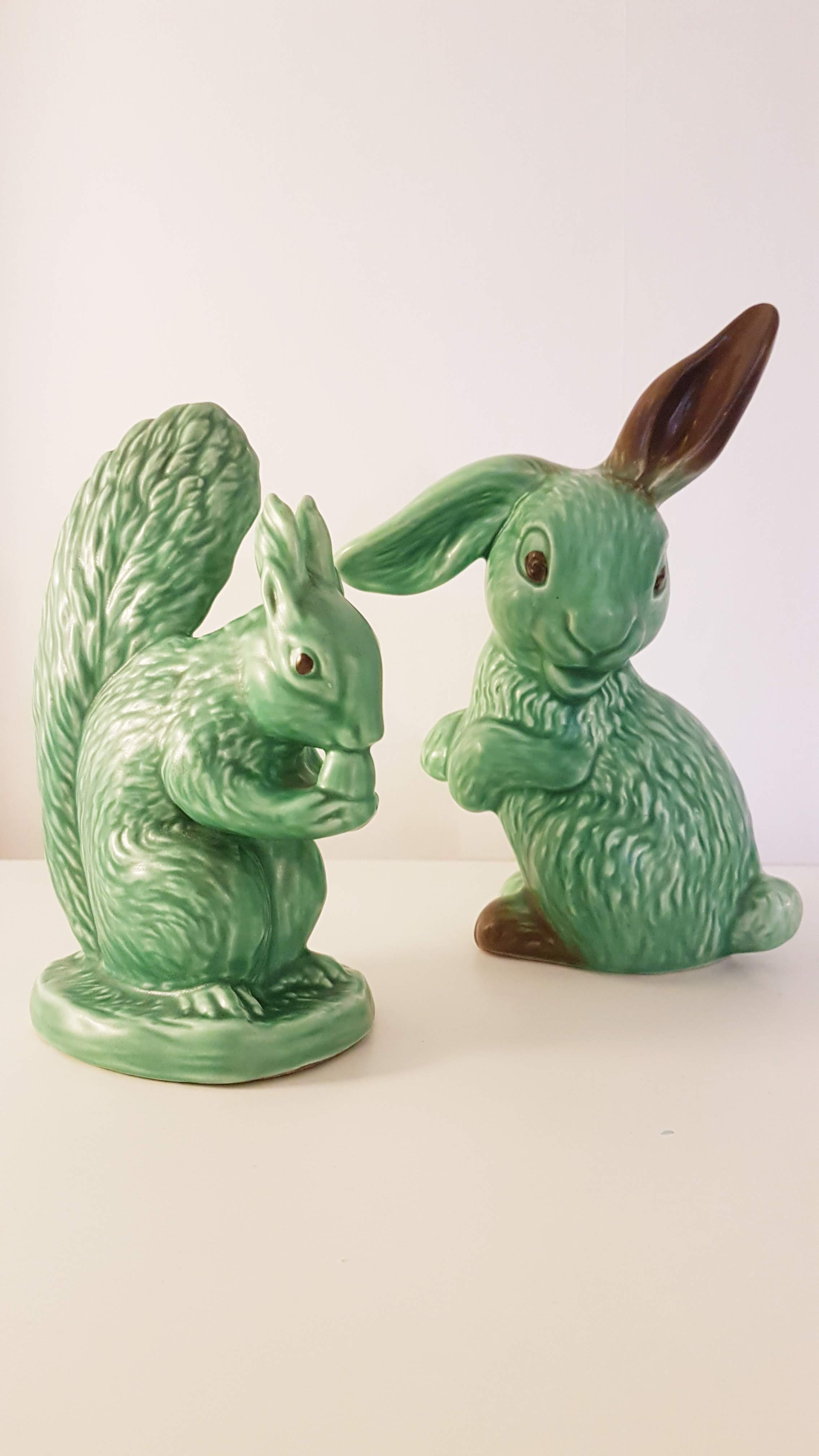
SylvaC Squirrel and Lop Ear Rabbit in Green

SylvaC (with a deliberate capital C at the end) is a brand of British ornamental pottery characterised primarily by figurines of animals and Toby Jugs. The SylvaC company ceased production in 1982.

The company was founded in 1894 by William Copestake and William Shaw. They gave their names to the fledgling company - Shaw and Copestake. Copestake left in 1895, however, and Richard Hull became Shaw's partner. Hull's son joined in 1936 and in 1938 the Thomas Lawrence Falcon Pottery was bought (which produced pottery with the distinctive 'falcon' mark on it). However, the Shaw and Copestake company maintained its original name right up until the end.

Central to the SylvaC line throughout its history were figurines of animals, and Snub Nose Bunnies in particular. Dogs were also popular and virtually every breed was eventually characterised in pottery. SylvaC also produced hundreds of vases, kitchenalia, decorative items, facepots and moneyboxes. All seem to be collectable so there is something for everyone.

Although many colours and glazes were used, the distinctive beige or green glazes are most common. The Snub Nose Bunnies are very collectable and come in almost every colour, some being much more collectable than others (Yellow, Mustard and Purple being extremely sought after, while the more common beige and green can be bought for little money) Large "Fireside" bunnies and dogs are hard to find and cellulose models made by SylvaC are becoming more rare due to the delicate type of finishing. Gnomes can also be highly sought after in cellulose.

SylvaC pieces are not rare; however, they are becoming collectable; the best pieces can fetch high prices. Pieces made after 1982 are fakes or reproductions and are worth very little to real collectors. Collector groups like SylvaC Collectors on FaceBook exchange information on genuine pieces and how to spot the fakes and reproductions so that collectors can avoid paying too much for the non genuine items.

The Falconware/SylvaC brands have passed through many hands since the days of Shaw & Copestake

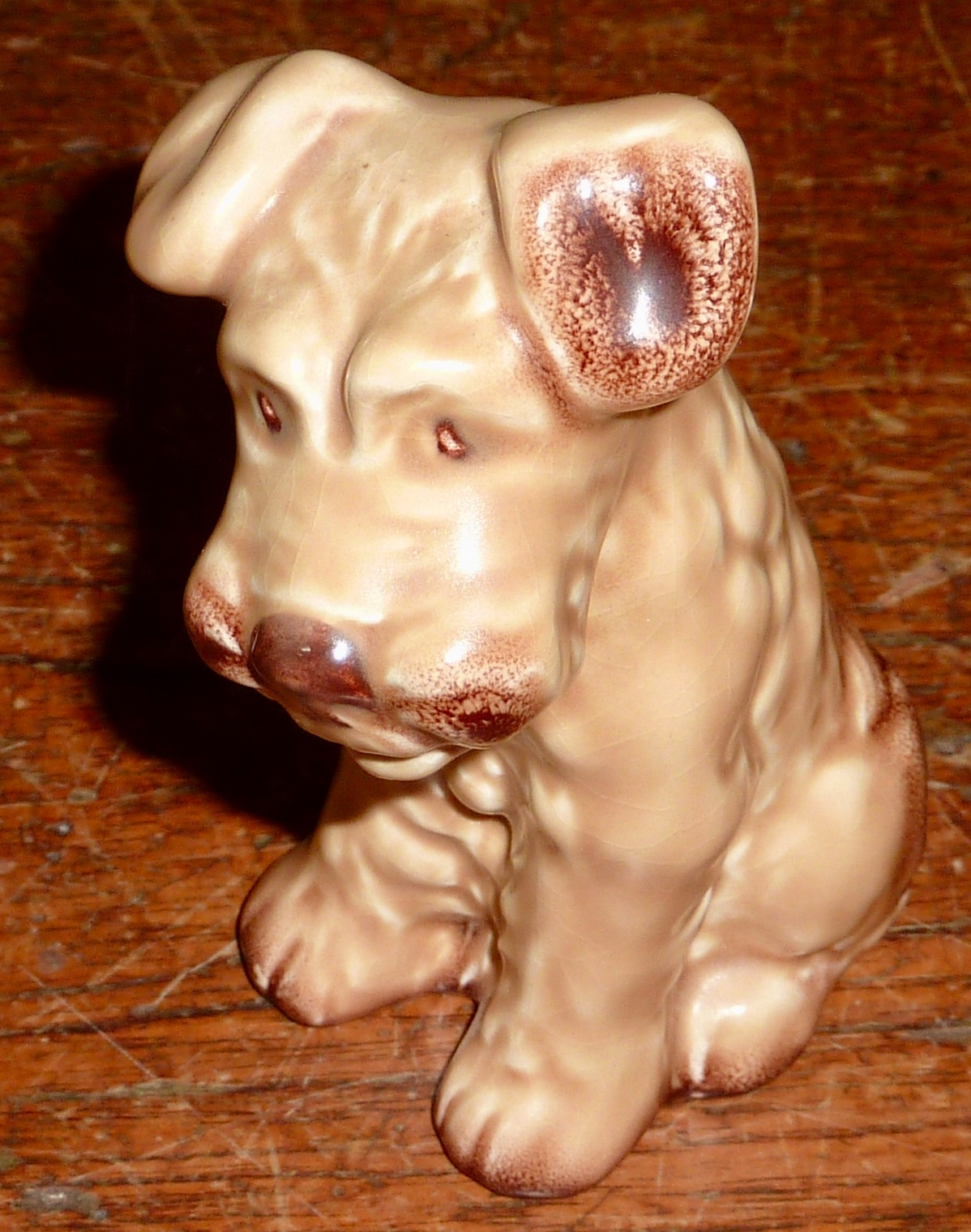
SylvaC Terrier Sitting Dog Model 1378

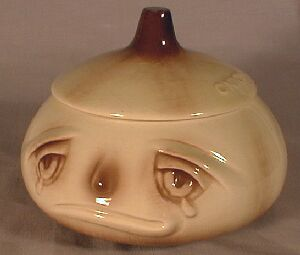
SylvaC onion 'face pot'

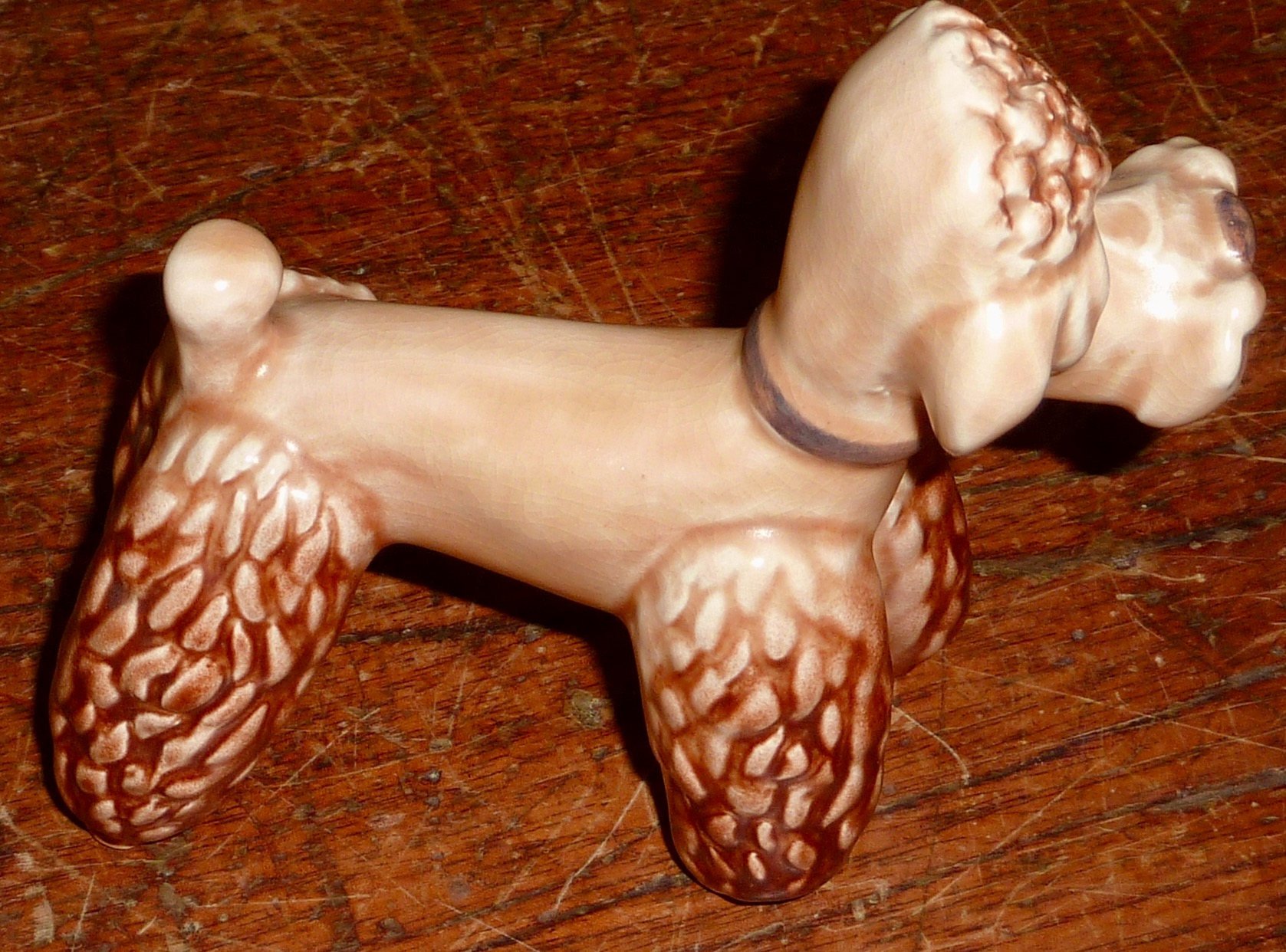
SylvaC Standard Poodle Model 3110

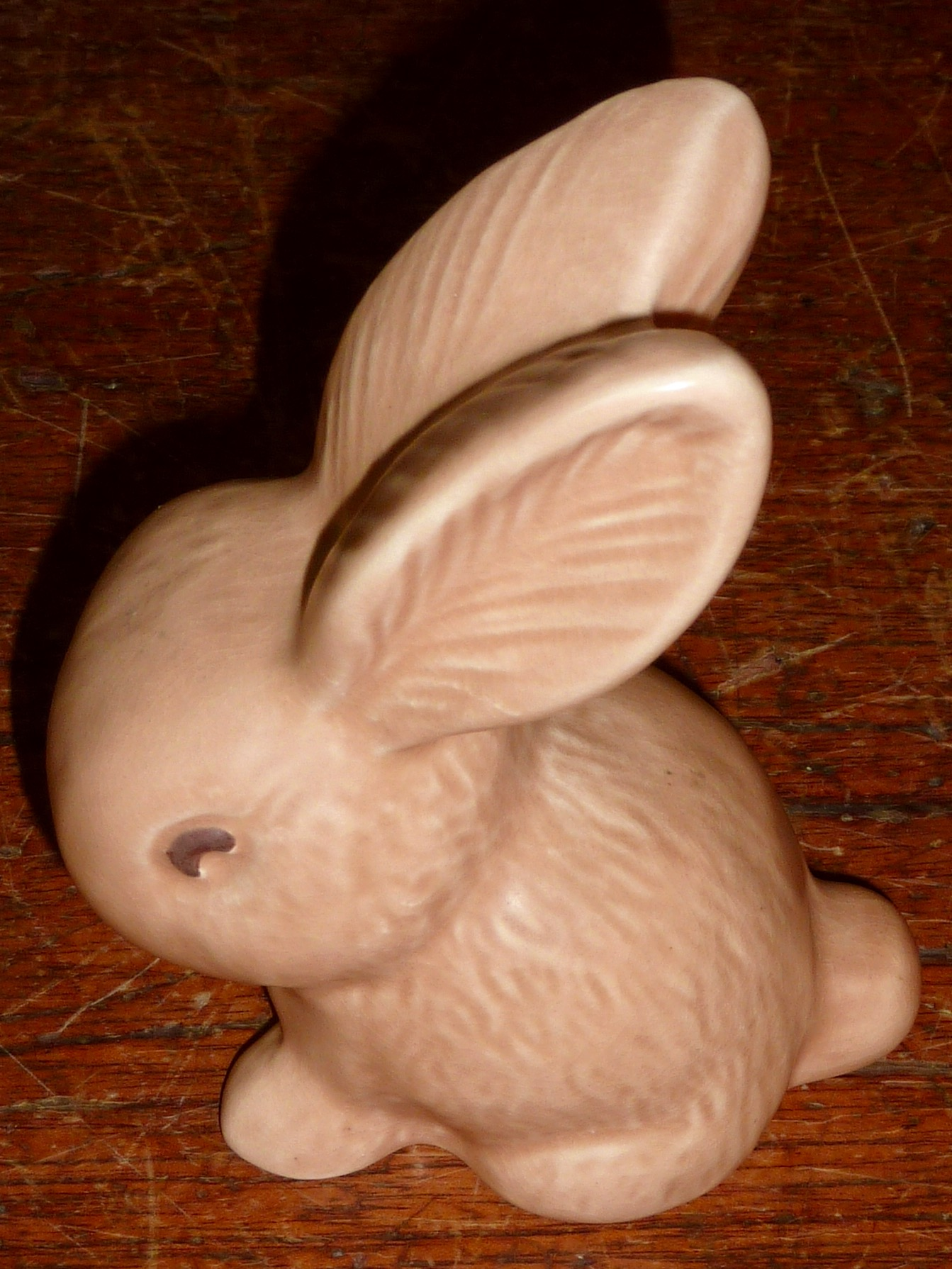
SylvaC Rabbit Model 990
