= Cardiff Riverside Branch =

Former railway in Wales

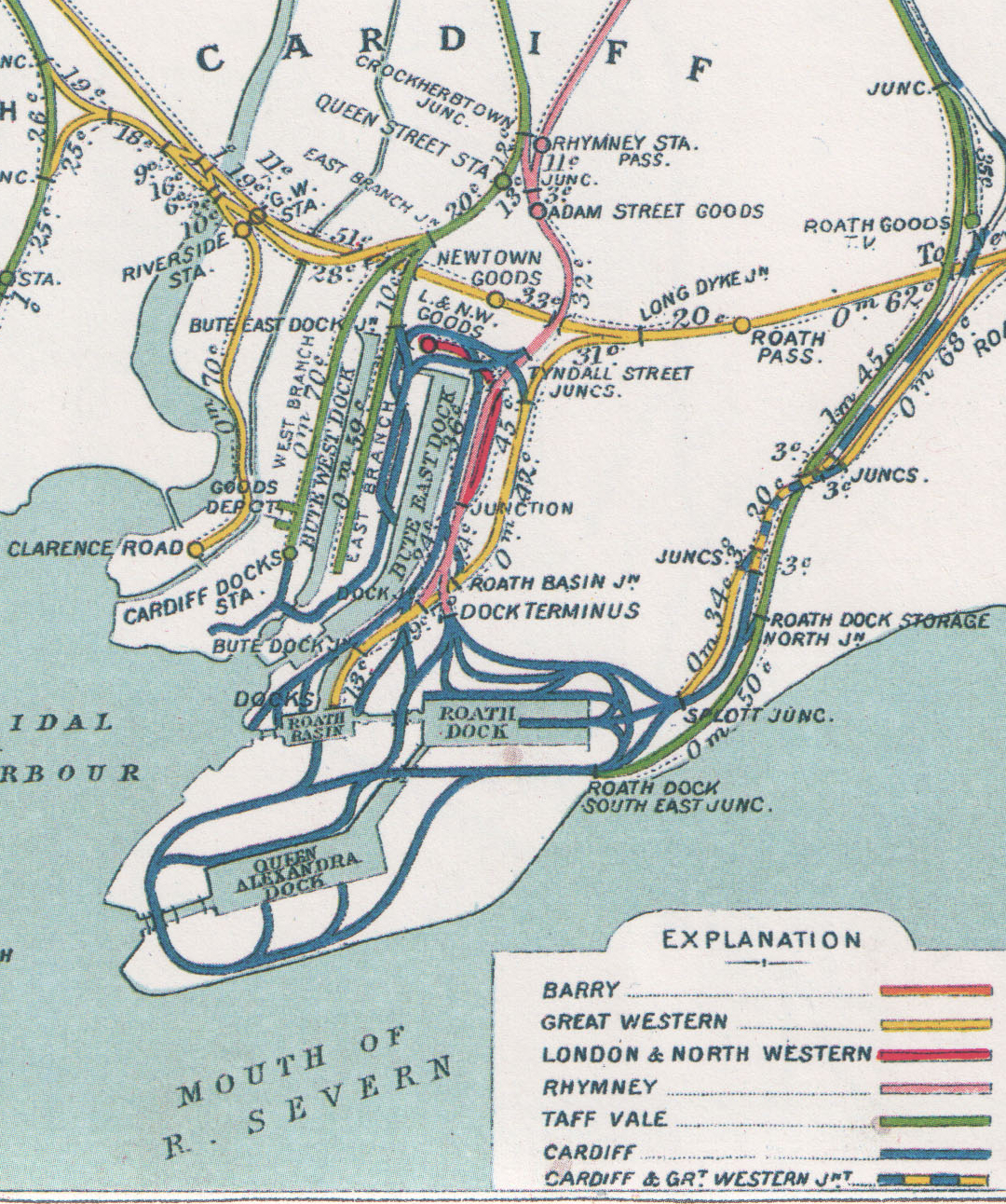
Railway Clearing House junction diagram of Cardiff and district (1911), the Riverside Branch is left of centre in yellow

The Cardiff Riverside Branch was a short railway constructed as an industrial railway in Cardiff, South Wales by the Great Western Railway. The line was subsequently upgraded for passenger services.

New industries had developed along the banks of the River Taff south from Cardiff Central station towards Cardiff Docks. Whilst the main Bute and Roath docks were well serviced by both the Great Western Railway (GWR) and the Taff Vale Railway (TVR), the relatively thin spit of land between the River Taff and the Glamorganshire Canal, known locally as "Rat Island", was not.

Cardiff Riverside station was built immediately to the south of Cardiff Station (the mainline GWR station, now called Cardiff Central), with the tracks joining the GWR mainline immediately to the west. Construction began in early 1882, reaching an interim goods-only station two-thirds along the spit, allowing opening on 14 September 1882. This served several factories, notably Curran Steels, to the west of the line, which produced rolled steel and brass and then pressed them to make enamel wares. The line was then extended to a second goods-only station at Clarence Road (at 51.4646°N 3.1713°W), making the total length of the line 0.7 miles (1.1 km).

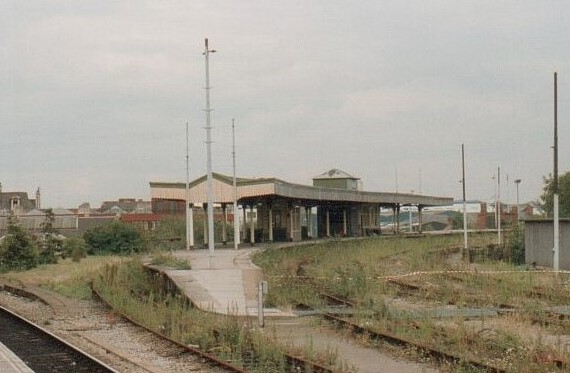
Cardiff Riverside Station in 1993

In 1894 the line was upgraded for passenger use, allowing the TVR to extend its existing passenger services, running from Cogan to Clarence Road from 2 April 1894. This also allowed connection to be made with the Cardiff Tramways Company system. During both World Wars the line was used to transport raw materials and munitions to and from the Curran's works, which became a munitions factory manufacturing shell casings and tank tracks. Production of machine gun ammunition continued until the 1960s.

The line continued to run under British Railways from 1948. The passenger service to Clarence Road station closed in March 1964. Freight services to the Curran's yard sidings continued until July 1968, when the entire line was closed and quickly taken up.

The entire spit has been redeveloped, with industry squeezed out between developing office, retail and housing developments. Few signs of the former line or its stations exist today.

== See also ==
- Butetown branch line
