= Curran Steels =

Welsh manufacturing company (1903–2005)

- Formerly: Edward Curran Engineering Co.
- Founded: 1903
- Founder: Edward Curran
- Defunct: 2005
- Headquarters: Butetown, Cardiff, Wales
- Products: Furnaces; munitions; enamelled metalware; baths
- Parent: Reed International (1973–1985); Caradon Ltd (1985–2005)

Curran Steels was a manufacturing company in Cardiff, Wales, founded as the Edward Curran Engineering Co and known locally as Curran's.

The factory was located on the east bank of the River Taff, near to Cardiff Docks. It was served by the Riverside branch railway.

== History ==
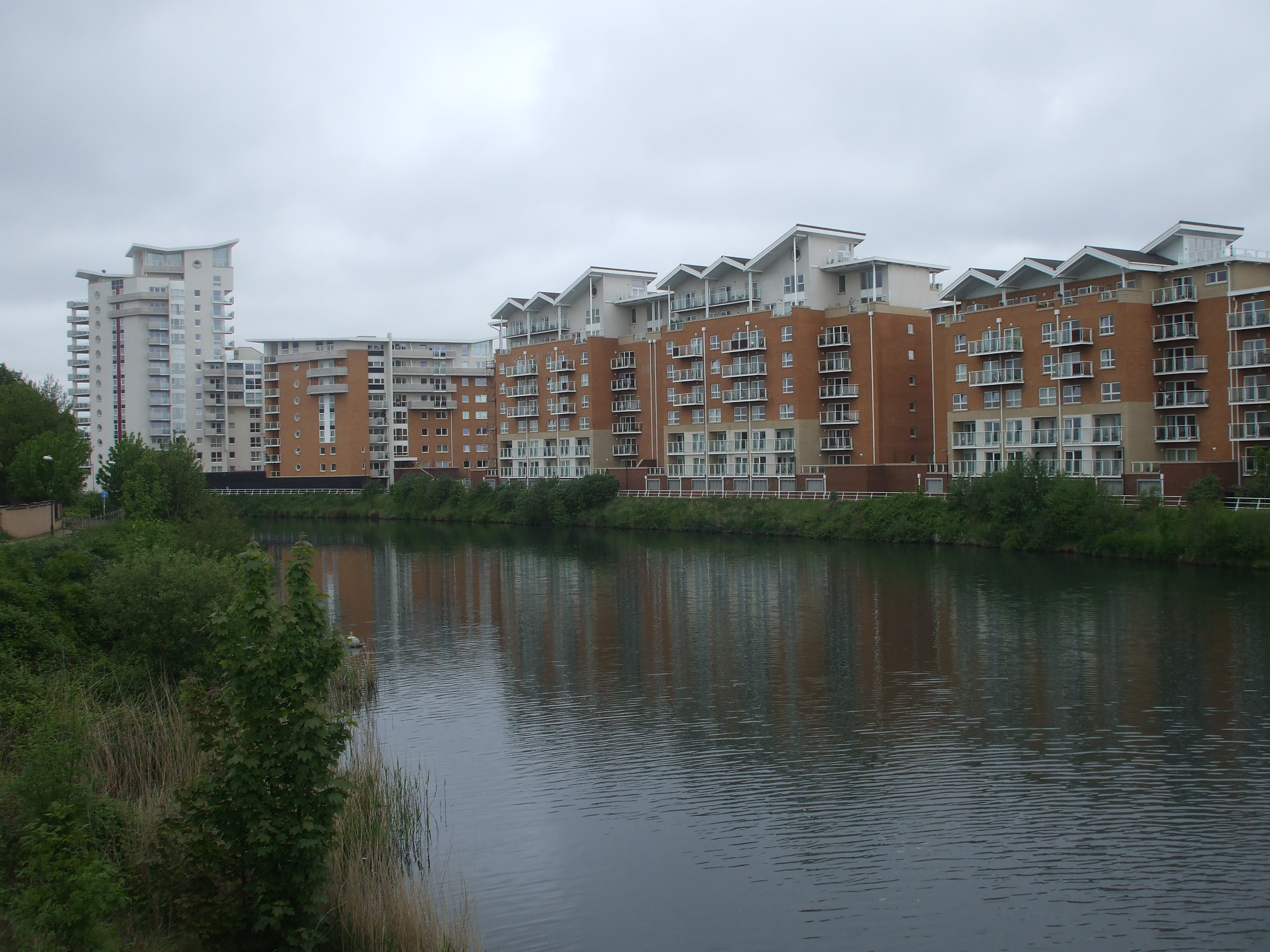
The east bank of the River Taff, near the former location of Curran Steels

The Edward Curran Engineering Co. was founded in Cardiff in 1903 by Edward Curran, whose father Charles was an Irish stonemason who had settled in Cardiff, then a thriving coal port. Edward Curran was also a stonemason. The company opened a foundry in Hurman Street, Butetown, in or adjacent to the site of the former Bute Shipbuilding and Engineering Works (at 51.466°N 3.171°W). The firm initially specialised in producing furnaces for annealing metals, one of which was built for Mountstuart Dry Docks in Cardiff in 1909.

Immediately before the outbreak of the First World War in 1914, Curran's supplied several annealing furnaces to the Royal Arsenal in Woolwich, London, and had built a major munitions factory in Ward End, Birmingham. In 1915 Curran's converted a building next to their iron foundry into a plant for manufacturing shell casings. Production of 4 1/2-inch (110 mm) brass howitzer shell casings started in 1916, continuing until the end of the war with over seven million 4 1/2-inch shell casings produced.

After the First World War the business diversified and it products included enamelled metalware, including cups and plates. These were manufactured using the staff and equipment previously used for shell casing production, and Curran's maintained their capability to manufacture munitions.

By the 1930s Curran's was virtually the only British company with significant munitions manufacturing capability, and it took a leading role in the British re-armament before the Second World War. During the war Curran's continued to produce munitions. The factory was damaged several times in German Bombing raids.

After the Second World War the factory resumed the production of enamelware. In 1961 they started production of pressed steel baths, and acrylic baths in 1972.

In 1973 the company was acquired by the Building Products division of Reed International, adding Curran's steel and acrylic bath products to the toilets and washbasins of Twyford, which Reed had acquired in 1971. In 1985 Caradon Ltd acquired Reed International's Building Products division, including Curran.

Curran's factory in Cardiff closed in 2005. The buildings were demolished and the site used for housing.

Dame Shirley Bassey worked packing chamber pots in Curran's packing department in 1951, before her career as a singer.
