= Joshua Twyford =

Joshua Twyford (sometimes shown as Josiah Twyford; 1640–1729) was a manufacturer of pottery in the Staffordshire Potteries, England.

== Life ==
He was born probably in Shelton near Stoke-on-Trent, and baptized on 6 December 1640, son of William Twyford and his wife Margaret.

Little is known of his life; Twyford is known essentially as an important producer of fine earthenware and stoneware, and as an ancestor of the pottery manufacturers Thomas Twyford (1827–1872) and Thomas William Twyford (1849–1921).

== Legend ==
According to The History of the Staffordshire Potteries (1829), by Simeon Shaw, Twyford obtained employment at the pottery at Bradwell Wood of John Philip Elers and his brother David. They made red stoneware and salt-glazed stoneware; wanting their methods to remain secret, they employed only people of low intelligence. Twyford, and another future manufacturer of pottery John Astbury (or Joshua Astbury), pretended to be indifferent to the manufacturing operations. After leaving the Elers factory, Twyford set up his own factory at Shelton, using the processes he had learnt there.

This story is thought to be doubtful.
