= Clarence Road railway station =

Former railway station in Wales

Coordinates: 51.4646°N 3.1713°W

Cardiff Clarence Road
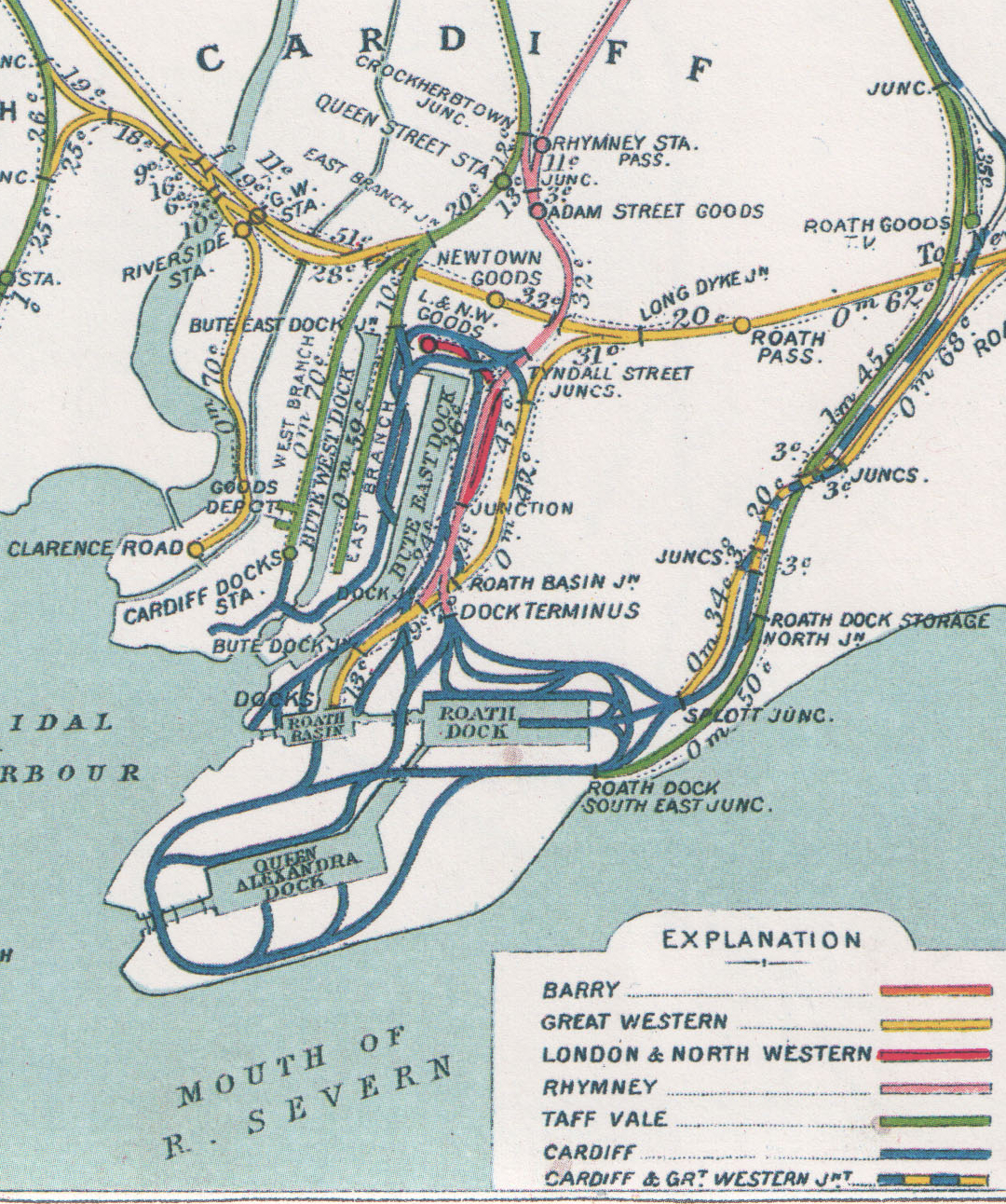
- 1911 map of railways in central Cardiff, Clarence Road can be seen left of centre in yellow.

General information
- Location: Cardiff; Wales
- Platforms: 1

Other information
- Status: Disused

Key dates
- 2 April 1894: Opened
- 16 March 1964: Closed
Location

Clarence Road railway station, was a railway station in Cardiff, and was the terminus of the Cardiff Riverside Branch. Initially, the line opened in 1882 and was used by the Great Western for freight services only. The passenger station was opened on 2 April 1894 but, although owned by the Great Western Railway, they never ran passenger services to the station until the Grouping in 1923. Prior to that, it served as a terminus for the Barry Railway for its services to Barry and Barry Island and for the Taff Vale Railway for its services to Cadoxton via Penarth. These services were taken over by the Great Western Railway in 1923 when the Barry and the Taff Vale were amalgamated with the Great Western. Photographs of the station show it to have been a simple structure consisting of one platform, with wooden buildings. It was closed on 16 March 1964, when British Railways withdrew passenger services from the branch, along with the Riverside platforms at the northern end of the branch at Cardiff General.

== See also ==
- Cardiff Bay railway station
