= Cliffe Vale, Staffordshire =

District of Stoke-on-Trent, England

Coordinates: 53.0161°N 2.1915°W

Cliffe Vale
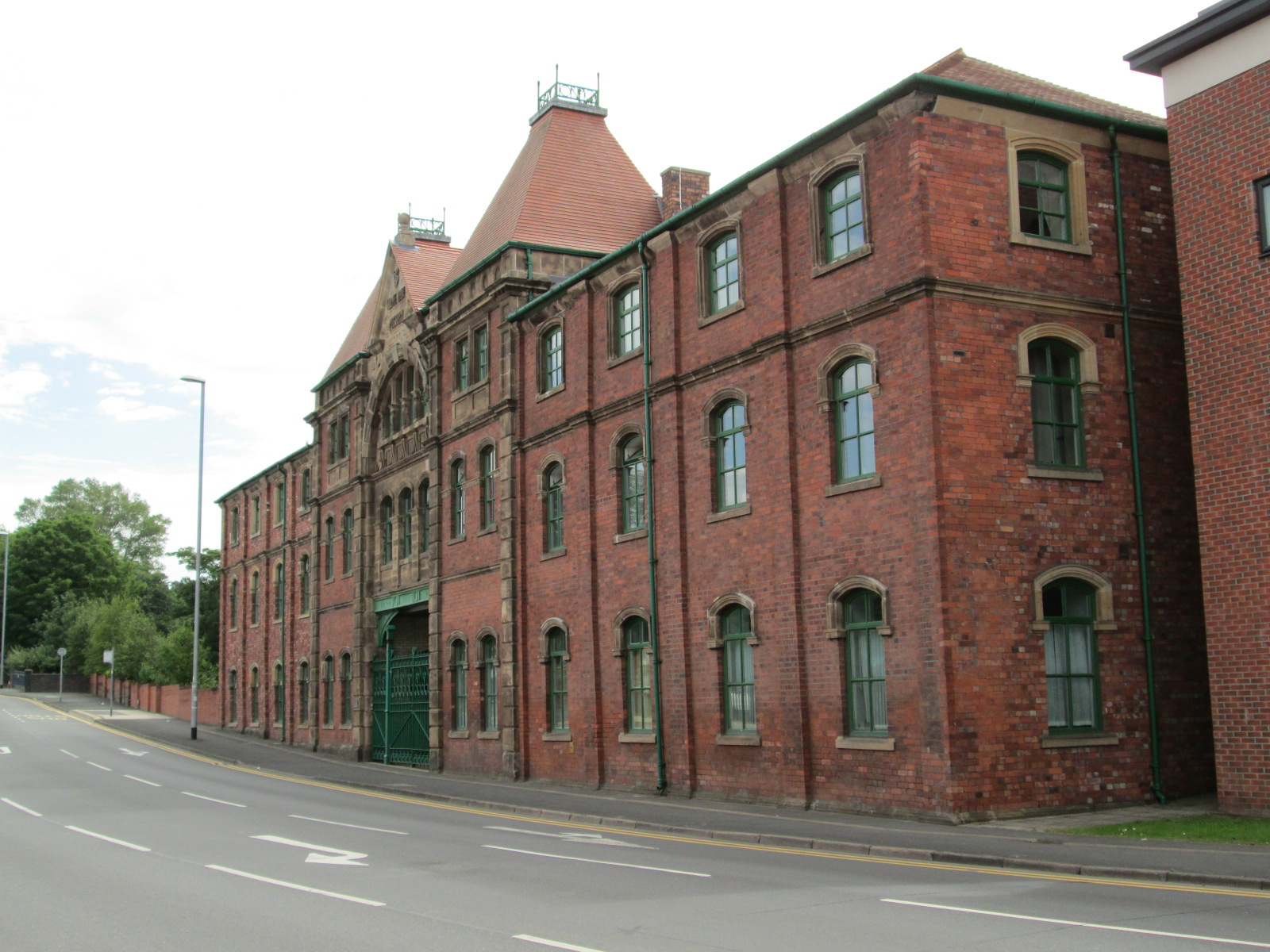
- The Cliffe Vale Pottery building in 2015

- Location within Staffordshire
- Population: 400
- OS grid reference: SJ872465
- Unitary authority: Stoke-on-Trent
- Ceremonial county: Staffordshire
- Region: West Midlands
- Country: England
- Sovereign state: United Kingdom
- Post town: STOKE-ON-TRENT
- Postcode district: ST4
- Dialling code: 01782
- Police: Staffordshire
- Fire: Staffordshire
- Ambulance: West Midlands
- UK Parliament: Stoke-on-Trent Central

Cliff Vale is a district of the city of Stoke-on-Trent, and lies to the immediate south of Etruria and just east of Basford and Hartshill. Cliffe Vale is in the valley of the Fowlea Brook, now better known as Etruria Valley. There are industrial and employment uses along the A500, and new residential developments along the Trent and Mersey Canal. The Shelton New Road (B5045) passes through from east to west. The area is sometimes called Cliff Vale (with no 'e') by the city council, and is part of the Hartshill electoral ward.

== History ==
The Roman road called Rykeneld Street passed directly through the Cliffe Vale area, although the exact route it ran along is unknown. Cliffe Vale takes its name from having been the 'Hay of Clive', part of a Norman deer hunting park that survived as such well into the 15th century...

"Great woods and forests are described in 1485, when Cliffe Ville (now Cliff Vale) was known as the King's Park or wood, fringed by Witton, or Winton Wood."

The lower Cliffe Vale section of the park - between Shelton Old Road and Etruria Road - was probably deforested sometime in the 15th century. The more elevated core of the hunting park became a landed estate and farm, and it is marked on the 1st edition six-inch (152 mm) Ordnance Survey map (circa 1860) as "Cliff Ville". The park survived into the 20th century as a large wooded area, and after being partly a farm this is now run as a local nature reserve under the name of Hartshill Park. The modern Hartshill Park overlooks the modern Cliffe Vale area.

The Trent and Mersey Canal was cut north–south through Cliffe Vale in the 1770s. What is now the West Coast Main Line railway track was built in the mid-1850s. There was a Cliffe Vale railway station, but this closed in 1865. In the Victorian era the area toward the canal specialised in carpentry, making wooden railway carriages at Cockshute sidings and narrowboats at the canal, while the area west of the train lines (Brick Kiln Lane) specialised in brick making.

A new ideal 'model' factory, Cliffe Vale Pottery, was built by T.W. Twyford in 1887, and his factory manufactured the world's first flushing toilets and other innovative sanitaryware for over 100 years. The Twyfords works closed in 1994, and moved to a purpose-built factory at Alsager. The nearby Armitage Shanks sanitaryware pottery, established at the Excelsior Works in Cliffe Vale from 1912, closed in 2007 and moved to a new factory at Middlewich. This closure brought to an end 120 years of sanitary innovation at Cliffe Vale, innovations that rapidly spread around the world and which have changed the way billions of people live.

The railway sidings and buildings at Cliffe Vale were used as the winter quarters for the world's biggest circus, Barnum & Bailey, from 1897 until 1911 when Twyfords expanded and the circus had to move elsewhere.

== Cliffe Vale today ==
The building of the A500 dual carriageway and Queensway in the 1970s bisected the area, effectively making the Brick Kiln Lane area into part of Basford, and blighting the run-down terraced housing that remained along Garner Street to the east of the A500. 160 residential terraced houses in Garner Street were demolished between 2002 and 2005, since they were deemed to be too near to the A500 road. This effectively removed the bulk of the residential population of Cliffe Vale.

In the 1990s and 2000s the canal and towpath was regenerated for boaters and cyclists, with the towpath becoming National Cycle Route No.5 and providing easy off-road access to Stoke-on-Trent railway station less than a mile away.

By 2007 there was a new 184-apartment canalside residential development on the defunct Twyfords site to the east of the A500, called Lock 38. New housing developments mean that Cliffe Vale will once again have a significant residential population by 2008, of around 400 people living in an 'urban village' of upmarket apartments.

Industry today consists of: Imerys, located on the Cliffe Vale rail terminal (aka Newcastle Junction), which handles three freight trains per week of Cornish china clay and thus supplies most Stoke-on-Trent potteries with clay; a large timber yard and timber wholesaler; the making of hand-made oak furniture; a dairy produce processing unit; a small estate of light industrial units in restored Victorian train sheds of the former North Staffordshire Railway. Major employers less than a mile away include the main campus of Staffordshire University and the University Hospital of North Staffordshire.

At the eastern edge of Cliffe Vale is the 29-acre Hanley Cemetery (1860 to present-day), originally the south part of the grounds of Chatterley Hall. It is still an active cemetery, and is run as a nature conservation area.

== See also ==
- List of North Staffordshire Railway halts
