= Toby Jug =

Type of jug

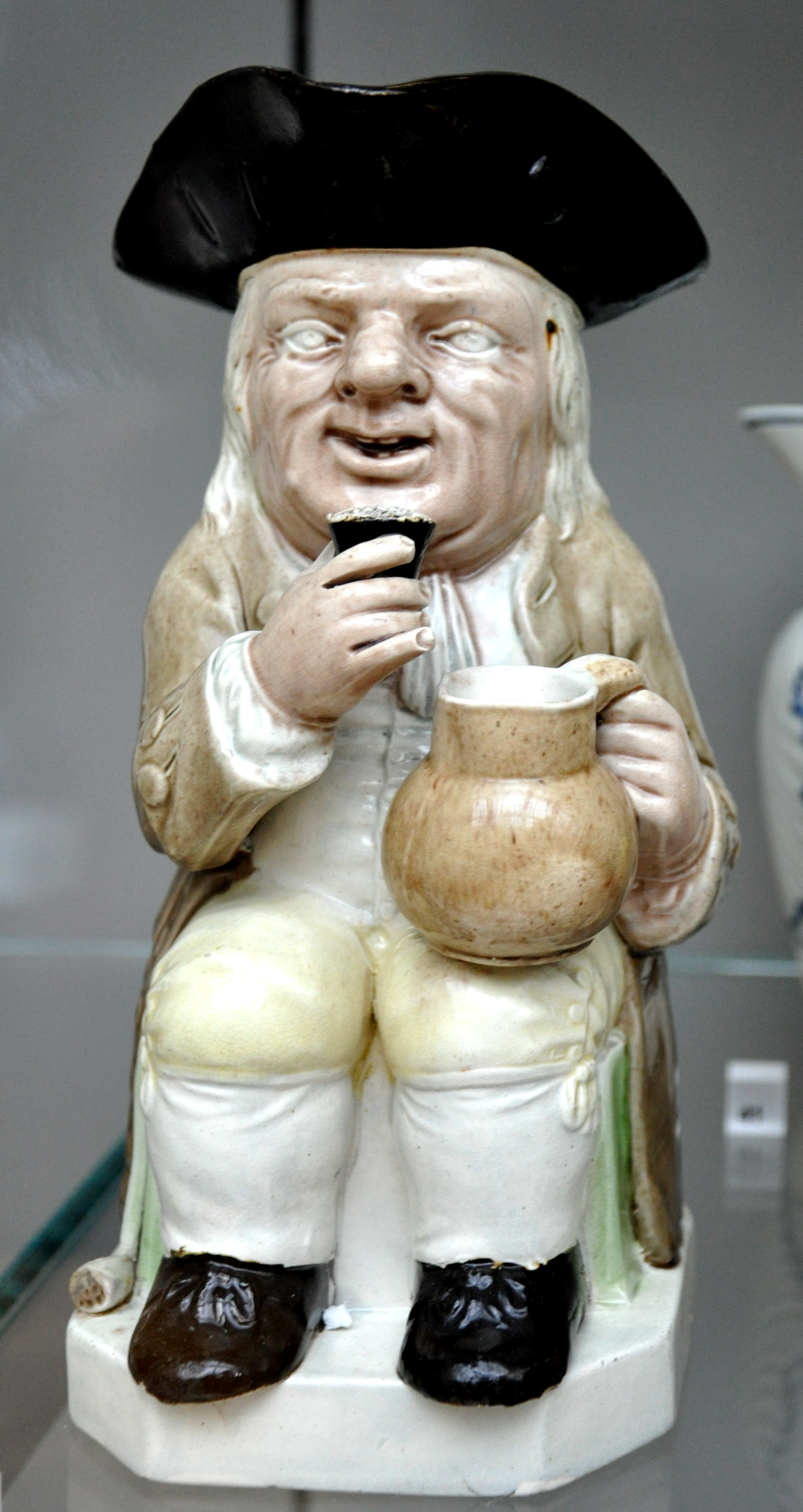
Toby Jug, made by Ralph Wood (the Younger), Burslem, c. 1782–1795; lead-glazed earthenware

A Toby Jug, also sometimes known as a Fillpot (or Philpot), is a pottery jug in the form of a seated person; whereas a character jug features the head of a recognizable person. Typically the seated figure is a heavy-set, jovial man holding a mug of beer in one hand and a pipe of tobacco in the other and wearing 18th-century attire: a long coat and a tricorn hat. The tricorn hat forms a pouring spout, often with a removable lid, and a handle is attached at the rear. Jugs depicting just the head and shoulders of a figure are also referred to as Toby jugs, although these should strictly be called "character jugs" or face jugs, the wider historical term.

The original Toby Jug, with a brown salt glaze, was developed and popularised by Staffordshire potters in the 1760s. It is thought to be a development of similar Delft jugs that were produced in the Netherlands. Similar designs were produced by other potteries, first in Staffordshire, then around England, and eventually in other countries, both in Europe and in British colonies.

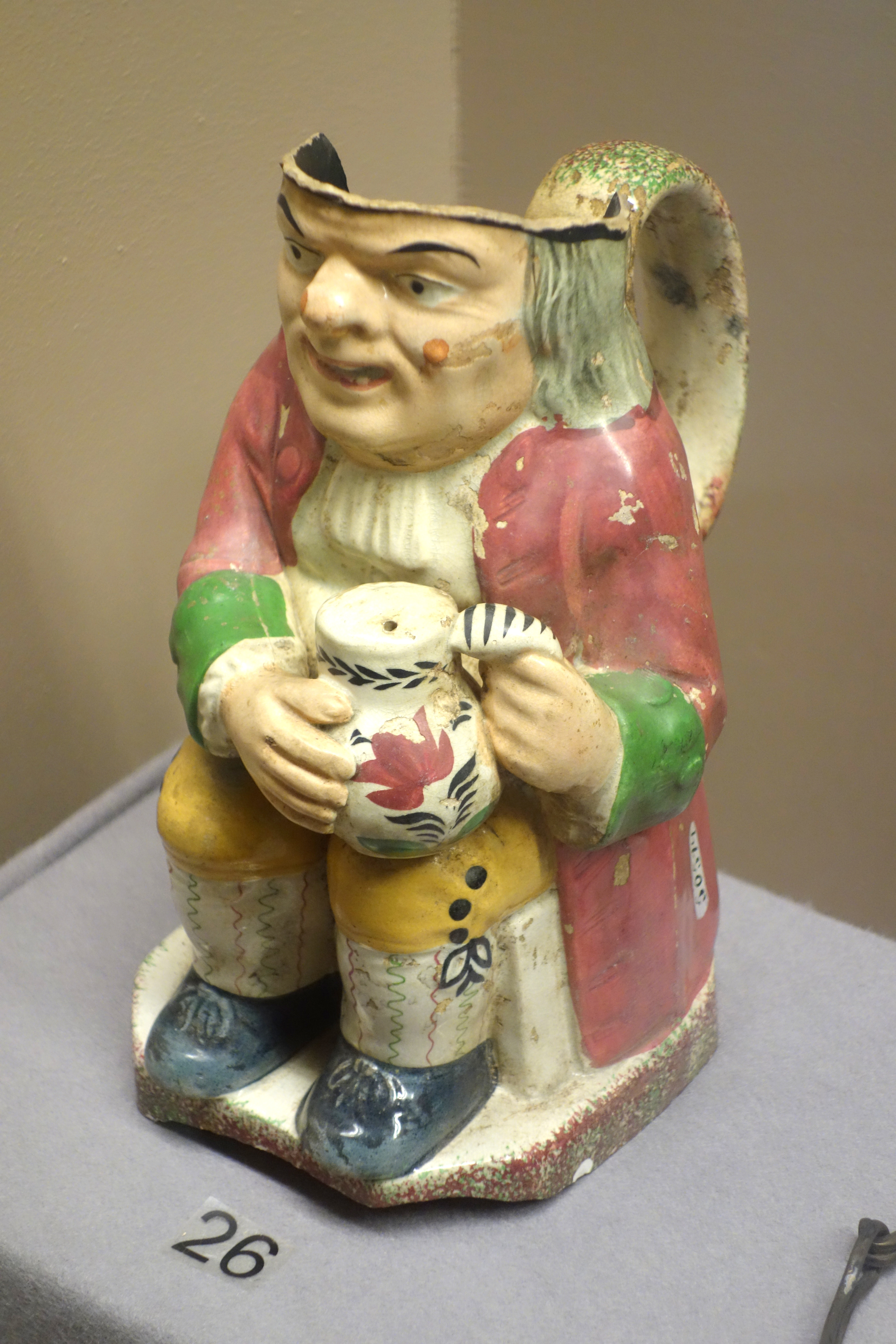
Toby jug found on a chief’s tomb in the Belgian Congo, dating from early 1800s, now in the Royal Museum for Central Africa

The Jug in the form of a Head, Self-portrait (1899) by Paul Gauguin is an unusual example from a painter. They were made in the 1760s in the Netherlands.

== Etymology ==
There are competing theories for the origin of the name "Toby Jug". Although it has been suggested that the pot is named after Sir Toby Belch in Shakespeare's play Twelfth Night, or Uncle Toby in Laurence Sterne's Tristram Shandy, the most widely accepted theory is that the original was a Yorkshireman, Henry Elwes, "famous for drinking 2,000 gallons of strong stingo beer from his silver tankard, while eating nothing ... He was nicknamed Toby Fillpot, and after his death in 1761 the London publisher of popular prints, Carrington Bowles, issued a mezzotint portrait of him. It became a best-seller — as did the Burslem Potter Ralph Wood's 'Toby' jugs based on the portrait." Toby Fillpot was also the subject of a popular poem, "The Brown Jug", by Francis Fawkes:

DEAR TOM, this brown jug, that now foams with mild ale,
(In which I will drink to sweet Nan of the Vale)
Was once Toby Fillpot, a thirsty old soul
As e'er drank a bottle or fathomed a bowl;
In boosing about 't was his praise to excel,
And among jolly topers he bore off the bell.

It chanced, as in dog-days he sat at his ease,
In his flower-woven arbour, as gay as you please,
With a friend and a pipe, puffing sorrows away,
And with honest old Stingo was soaking his clay,
His breath-doors of life on a sudden were shut,
And he died full as big as a Dorchester butt.

His body when long in the ground it had lain,
And time into clay had resolved it again,
A potter found out in its covert so snug,
And with part of fat Toby he formed this brown jug;
Now sacred to friendship, to mirth, and mild ale,
So here's to my lovely sweet Nan of the Vale.

== Cultural references ==
In the book and 1949 film Twelve O'Clock High a Toby Jug depicting Robin Hood is used as a signal in the officer's club, to discreetly warn aircrews that there will be a mission the following day, without revealing this to outsiders who might be visiting. The Toby Jug plays a pivotal role in the film.

A Toby Jug is referenced in the Kingsley Amis novel Lucky Jim.

A Toby Jug collector and her large collection also figure prominently in the plot of the 2017 Bravo/Netflix series Imposters.

== See also ==
- SylvaC
