= John Astbury =

British potter

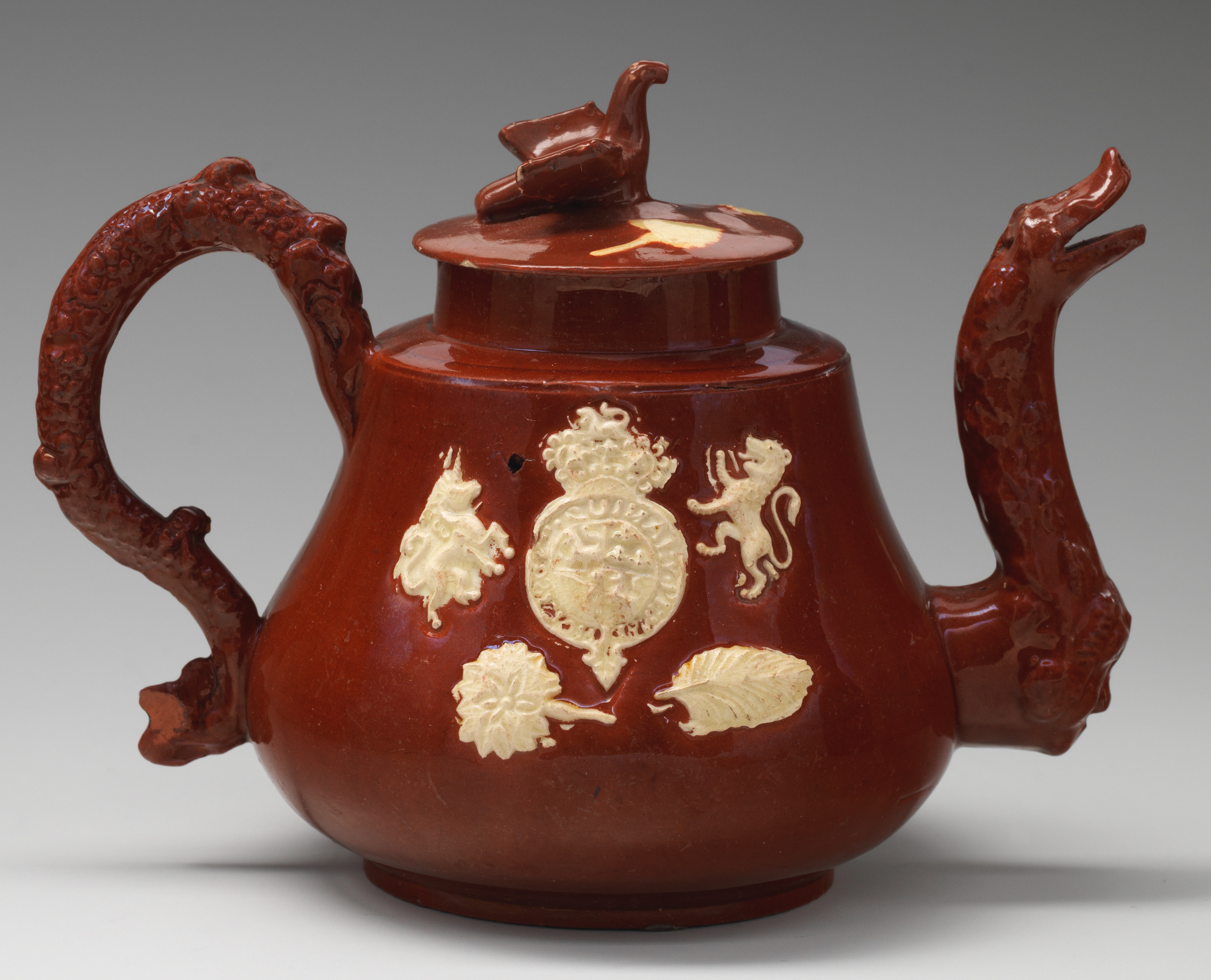
Red earthenware teapot with sprigging in cream, c. 1745

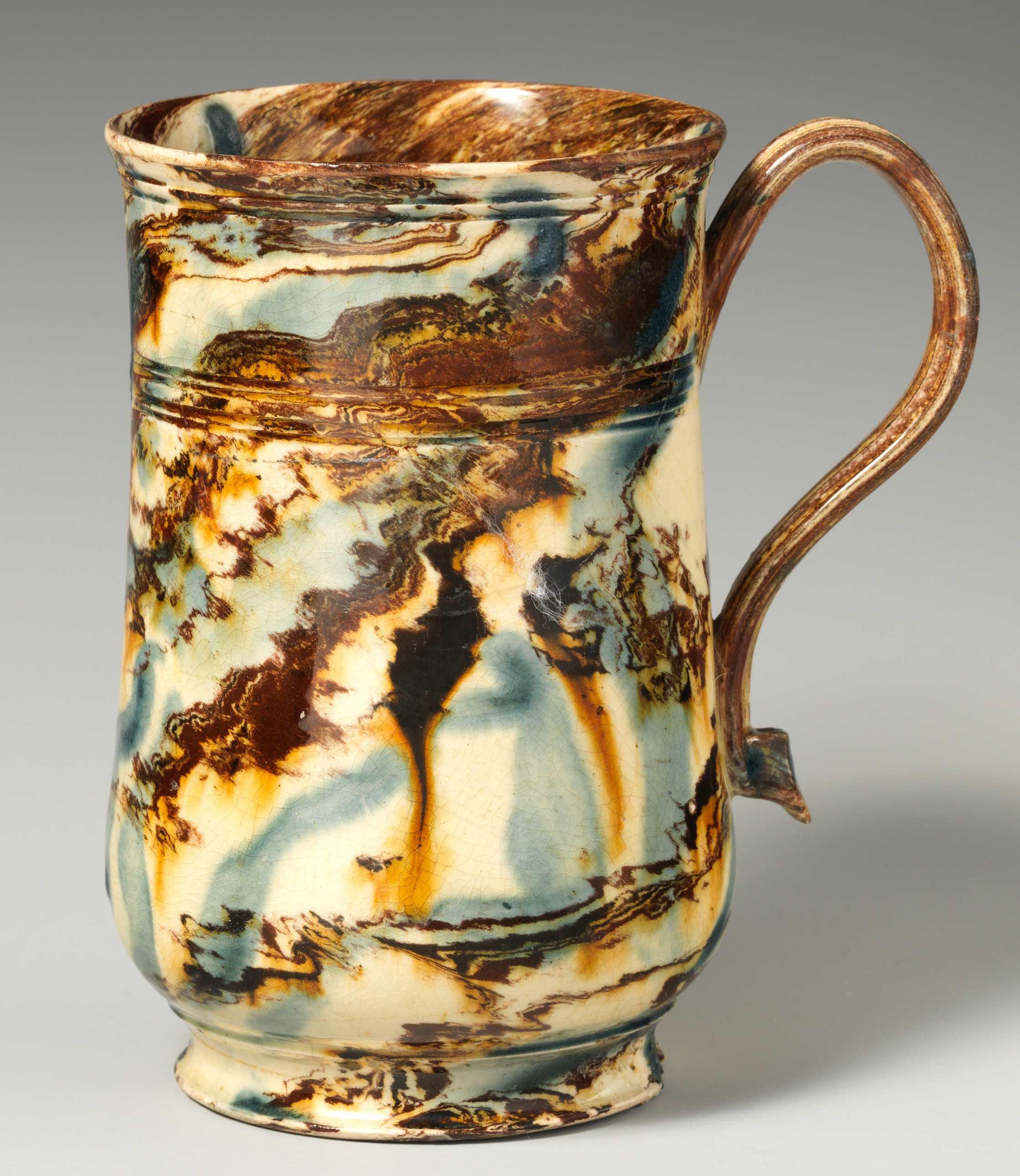
Agate ware mug, c. 1750

John Astbury (1688–1743) was an English potter credited with innovations and improvements in earthenware associated with Staffordshire figures.

Although an important figure, as with Thomas Whieldon there is considerable uncertainty over which actual pieces were made in his pottery, and so are Astbury ware. This has led to some museums such as the Metropolitan Museum of Art now calling all its pieces "Style of John Astbury". Astbury-Whieldon ware is another term used.

== Life and work ==
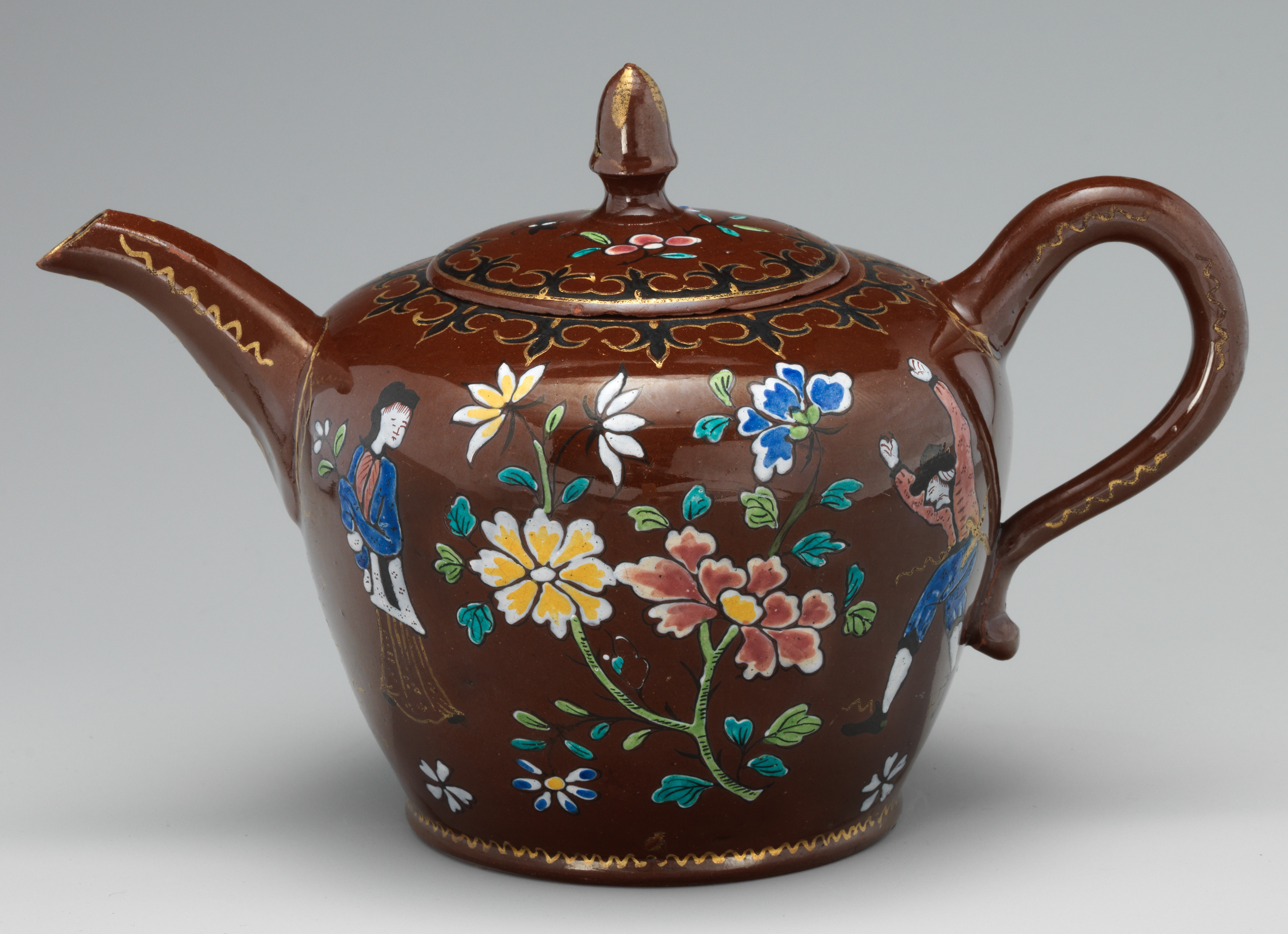
Teapot, c. 1750, Style of John Astbury, lead-glazed earthenware.

Astbury was reputed to have masqueraded as an idiot in order to gain access to the works of the Elers brothers, John Philip and David, Dutch emigrants who had settled in Bradwell, Staffordshire, about 1690. He discovered the secrets of their manufacture of red ware pottery, and set up a rival establishment at Shelton, also in The Potteries. He introduced the use of Bideford pipeclay, and in 1720, happening to notice a hostler blowing powder from a red-hot flintstone pulverised into the eyes of a horse as a remedy, hit upon the application of calcined flint in pottery, which greatly improved his ware.

His style of decorating with appliqués is called sprigging. His experiments in adding materials such as flint to potting clay led to changes in color and texture emulated by others. His early work with adding lead to glaze influenced creamware and the later work by Josiah Wedgwood.

He died in Shelton 1743, aged 55, and was buried in Stoke churchyard, having made a fortune, and leaving several sons.

== Family and influence ==
One son, Thomas Astbury, had begun business in Lane Delph, Stoke, in 1725, and was the first English manufacturer of what came to be called creamware. Samuel Astbury, also a potter, a brother of John Astbury, married Elizabeth, the sister of Thomas Wedgwood, father of Josiah Wedgwood, and was in 1744 one of the witnesses to the deed of Josiah's apprenticeship to pottery-making. One of Wedgwood's biographers attributed his success to his adoption of the important inventions described above, with which she credits Samuel Astbury. Possibly Samuel Astbury contributed to John's improvements of his art, but there seems no reason for doubting that it was John and not Samuel who was their discoverer.
