= Sprigging (pottery) =

Low relief pottery decoration

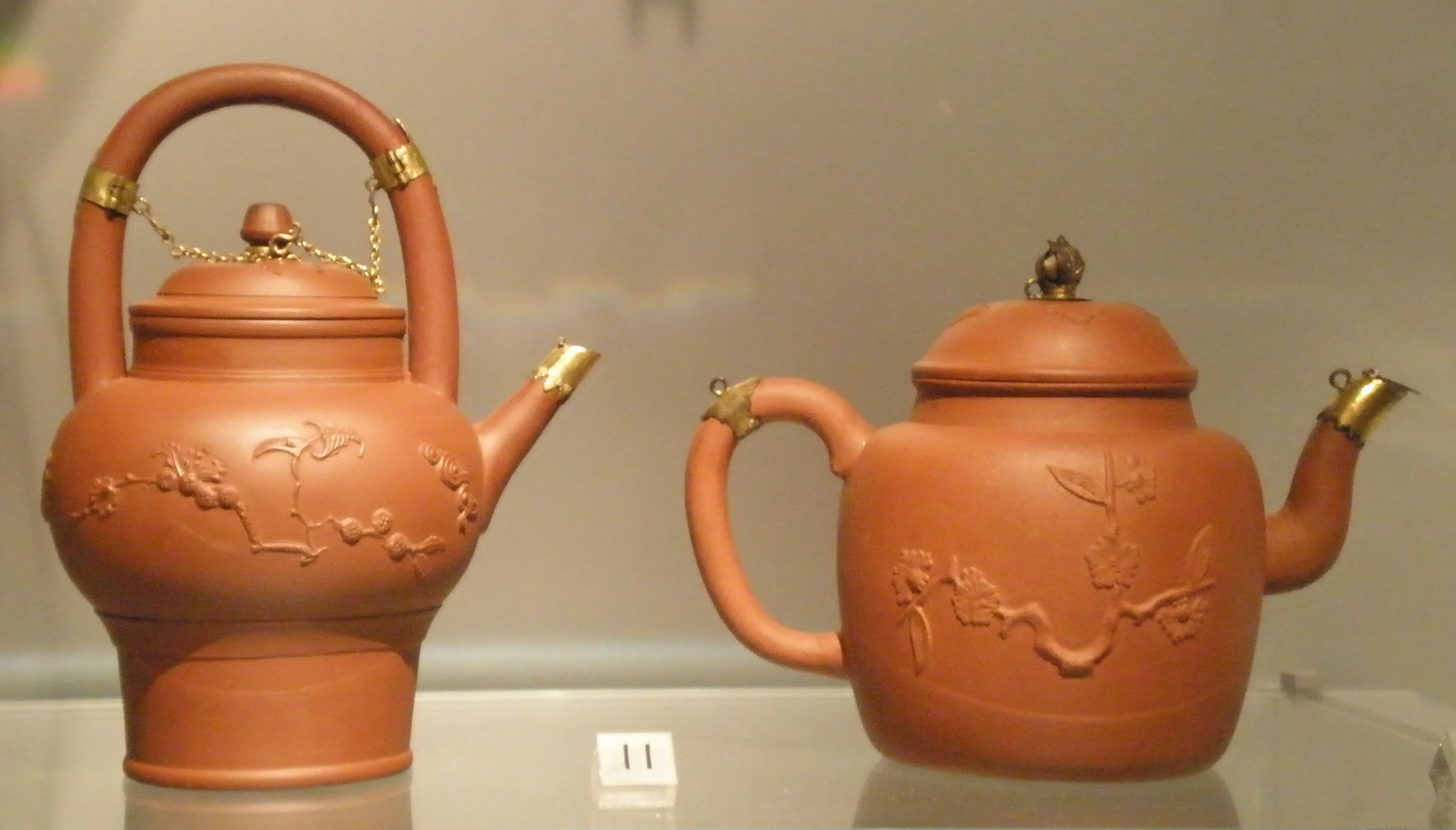
Two teapots with sprigged decoration: on the right a Chinese Yixing teapot dated 1627, on the left an English imitation of the 1690s by the Elers brothers, who introduced sprigging to modern English pottery

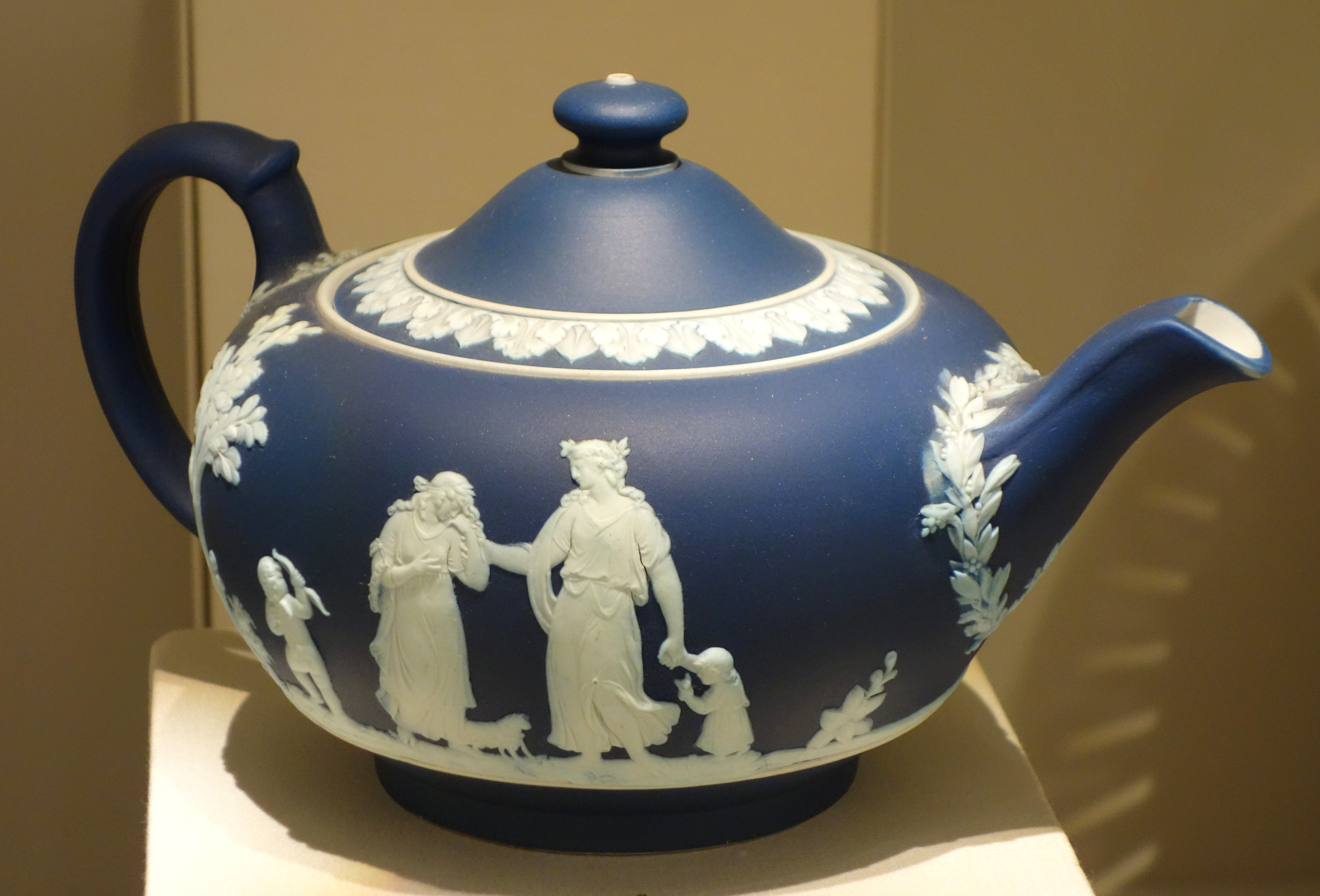
Wedgwood teapot in Jasperware, c. 1840

Sprigging or sprigged decoration is a technique for decorating pottery with low relief shapes made separately from the main body and applied to it before firing. Usually thin press moulded shapes are applied to greenware or bisque. The resulting pottery is termed sprigged ware, and the added piece is a "sprig". The technique may also be described by terms such as "applied relief decoration", especially in non-European pottery.

The alternative way to achieve similar effects without sprigging is to mould the whole body, which is also common. Pâte-sur-pâte is a very labour-intensive, and so expensive, method of producing similar, but more refined, effects in contrasting colors, invented in China and then in France in the mid-19th century.

== Technique ==
The clay body for the sprig is pushed into the mould, the back scraped flat, then released on a damp cloth pad. The greenware is wetted lightly with a brush, and the sprig is pressed lightly with another cloth pad to push out water and air. Slip may be used as an adhesive.

== History ==
Sprigging is used in ancient Roman pottery, and in China at least as early as the 6th century AD, continuing thereafter. It was not one of the main decorative techniques of Chinese ceramics, but for example was and is common on Yixing teapots. It is sometimes used on large celadon vases from the late Yuan dynasty or early Ming dynasty (14th century). By at least the 9th century it was used in Islamic pottery.

In Europe, after the basic wares of the Middle Ages, use revived in fifteenth-century German salt-glazed stoneware, which was very widely exported around Europe. In Britain the first successful attempts to imitate both German wares and the Yixing teapots which were now being imported, mostly via the Netherlands, came around 1690. Whether John Dwight of the Fulham Pottery or the German-born Elers brothers were first is uncertain. They used metal moulds, which tend to leave a thin line impressed into the body around the outline of the sprig.

White Chinese Dehua porcelain cups and pots with sprigged prunus (plum/cherry) blossom decoration were copied by several European porcelain factories in the mid-18th century, from Meissen and Sèvres to Bow. Sprigging was used extensively in the Staffordshire potteries on a variety of wares and reached a height with Josiah Wedgwood's Jasperware, and his replica of the Portland Vase in 1790, which fully exploited the possibilities of contrasting colours of body and sprig.

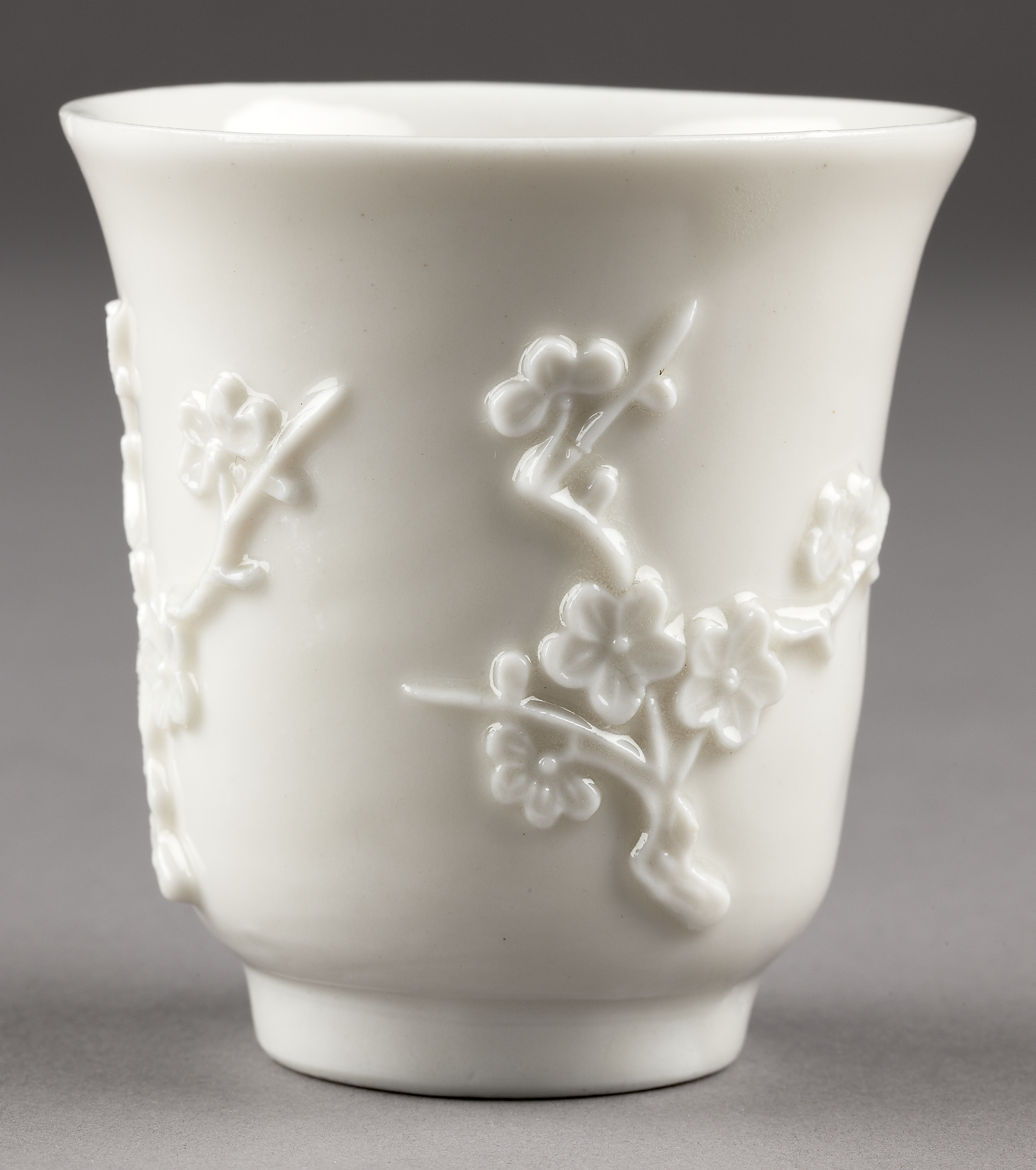
Chinese Dehua porcelain cup with prunus blossom, 17th century

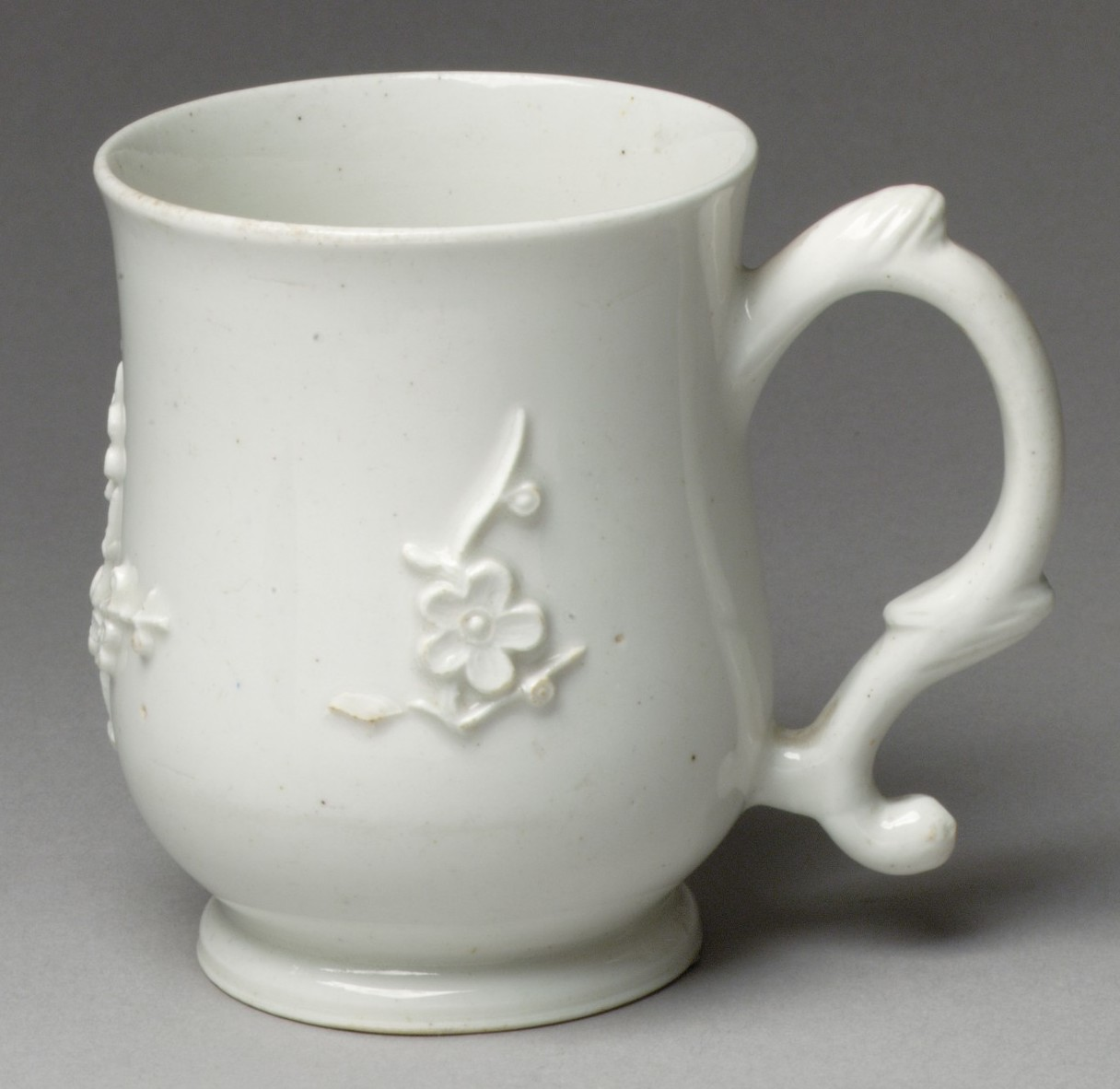
Bow porcelain mug, 1750s

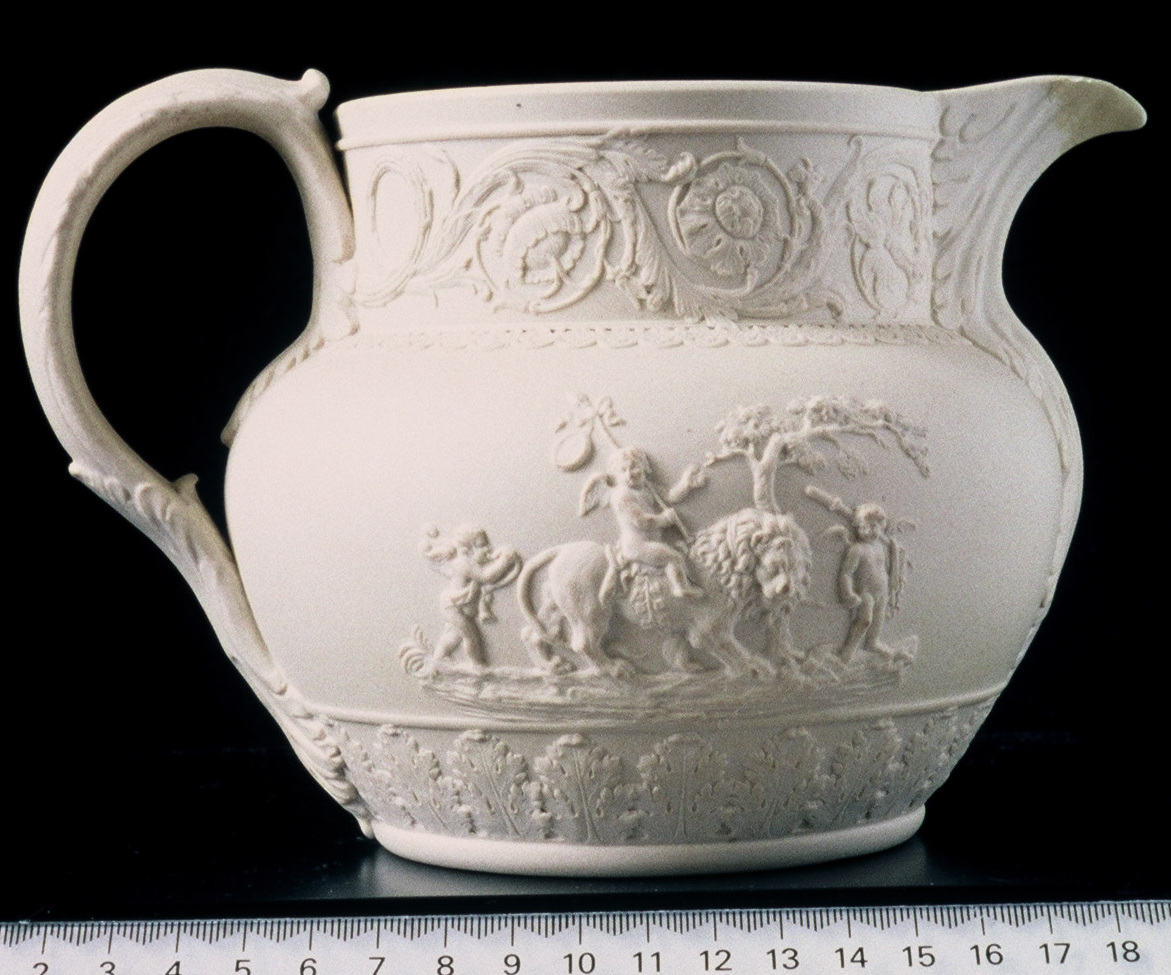
Jug in Staffordshire stoneware, before 1806
