= Folk art =

Art produced from an indigenous culture or by peasants or other laboring tradespeople

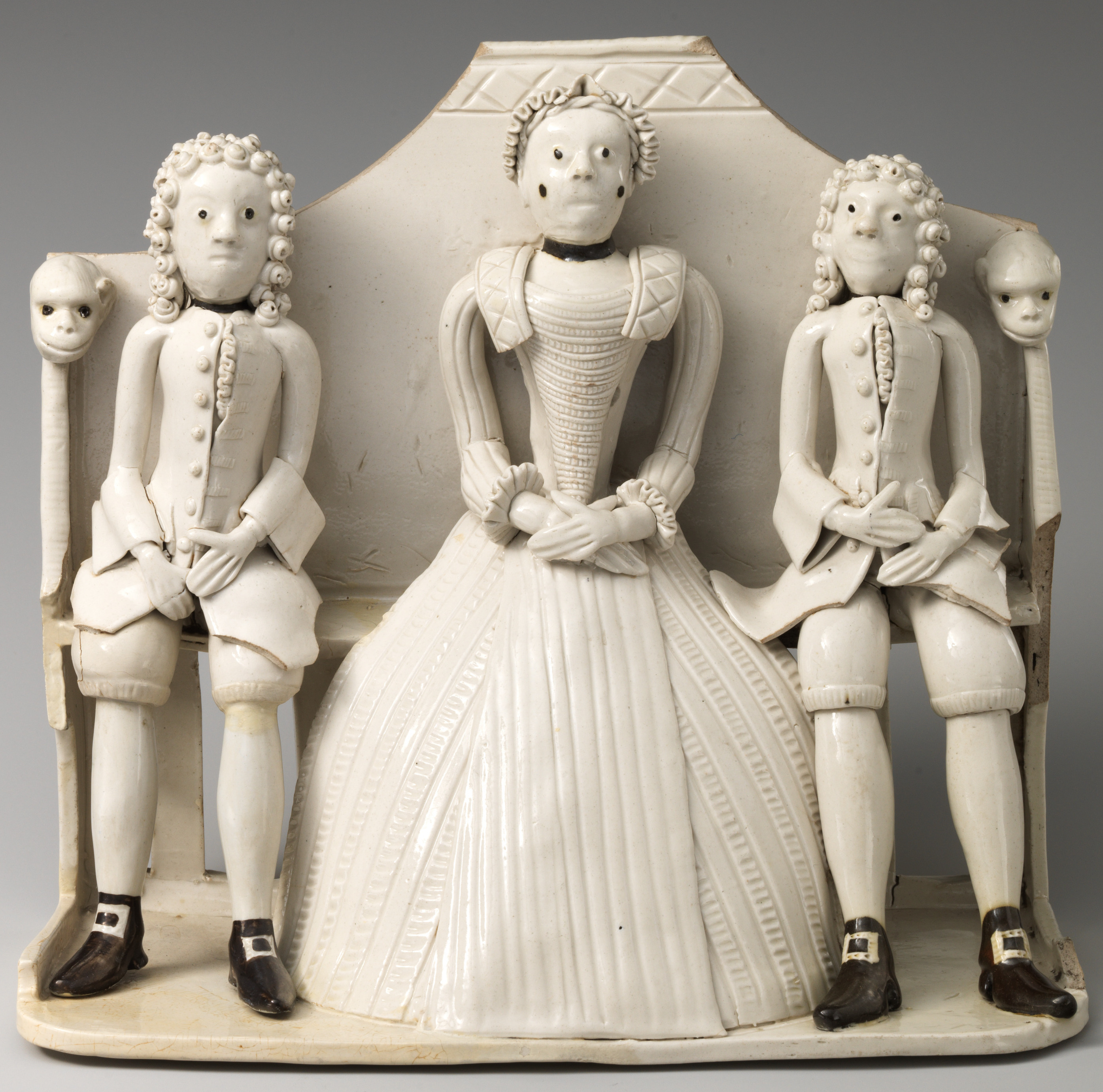
Pew group of Staffordshire figures, England, c. 1745, salt-glazed stoneware. 7 1/2 × 8 3/8 in. (19.1 × 21.3 cm)

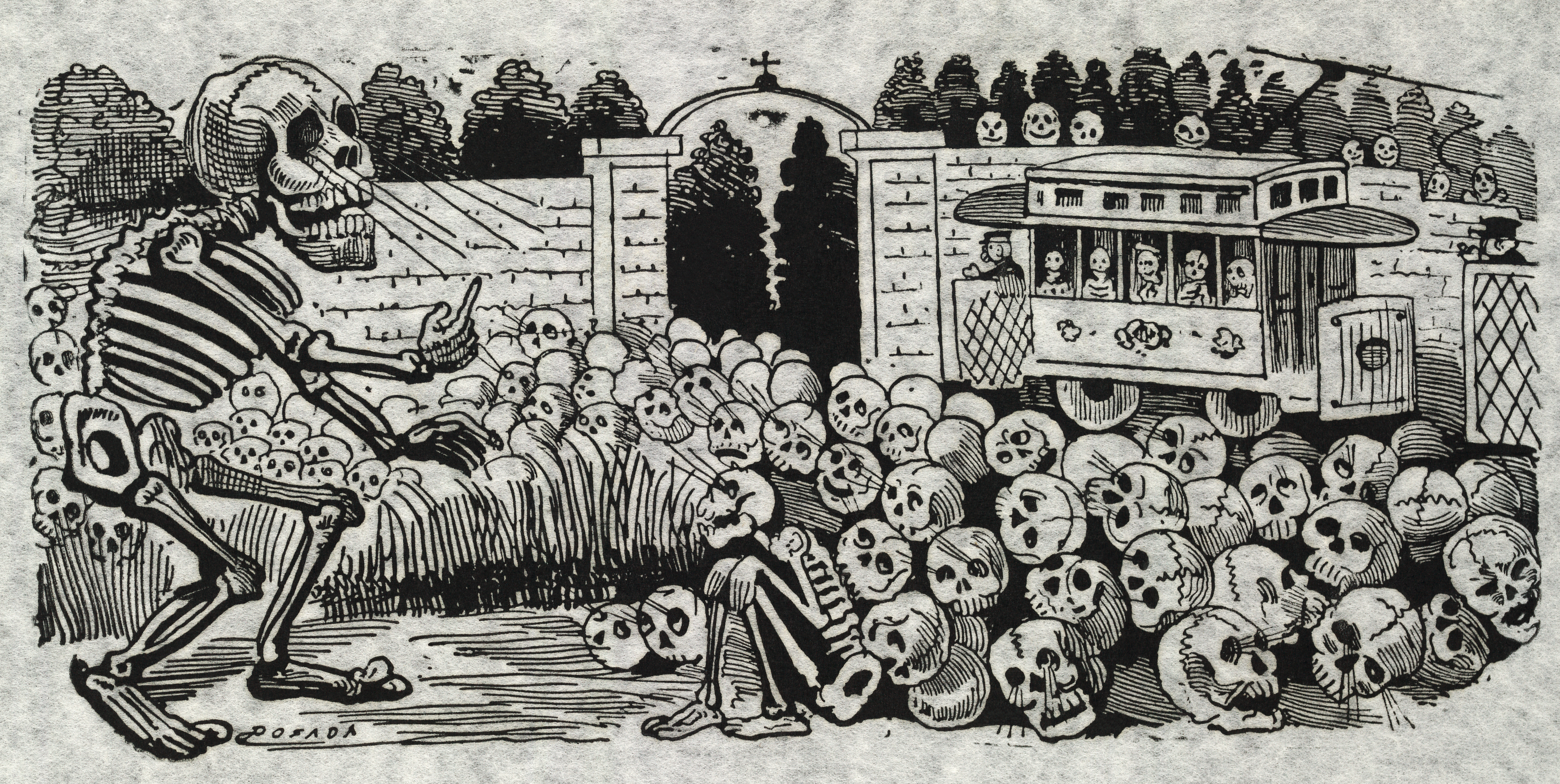
"Gran calavera eléctrica" by José Guadalupe Posada, Mexico, 1900–1913

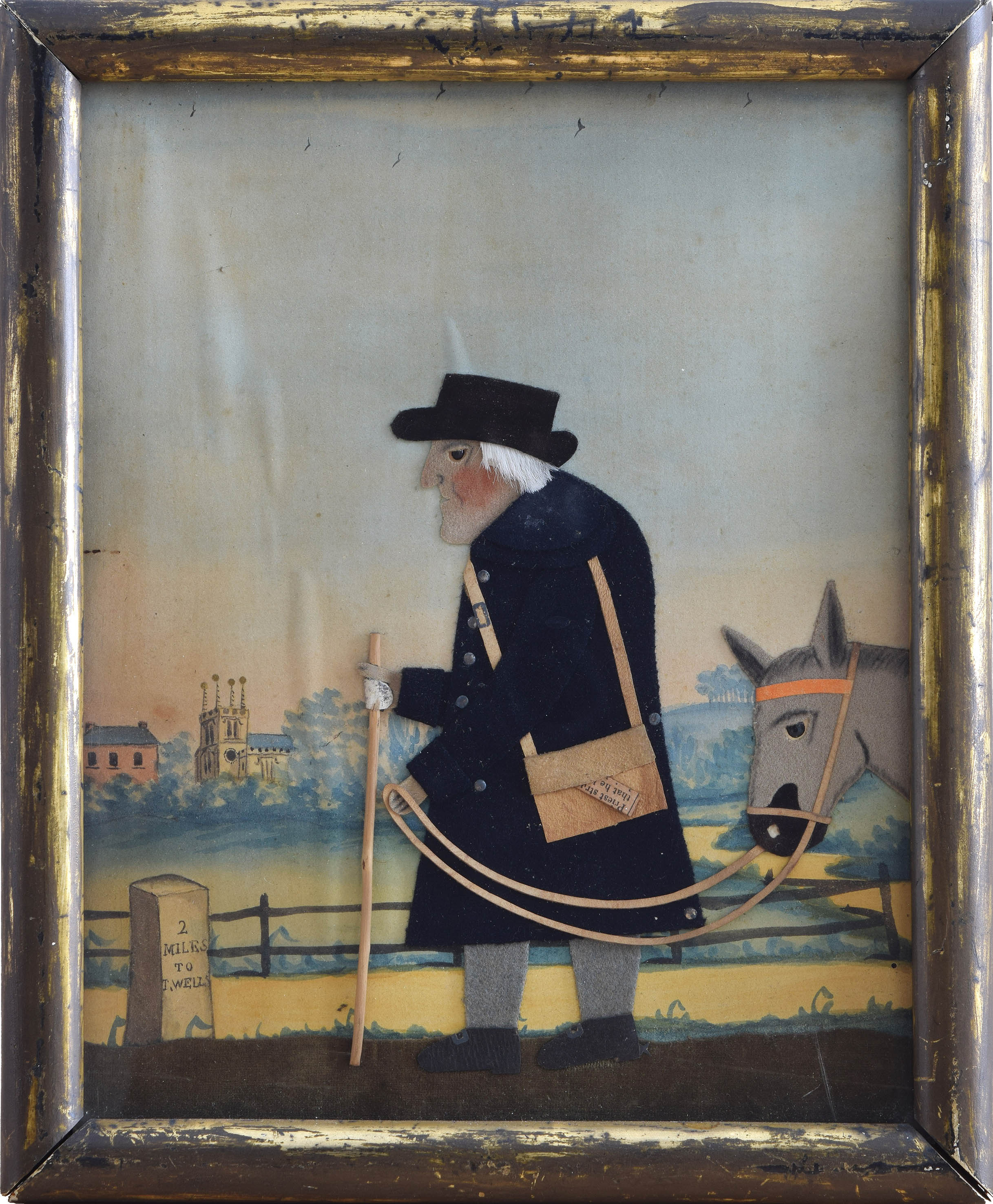
"Old Bright, The Postman", George Smart, c1830s

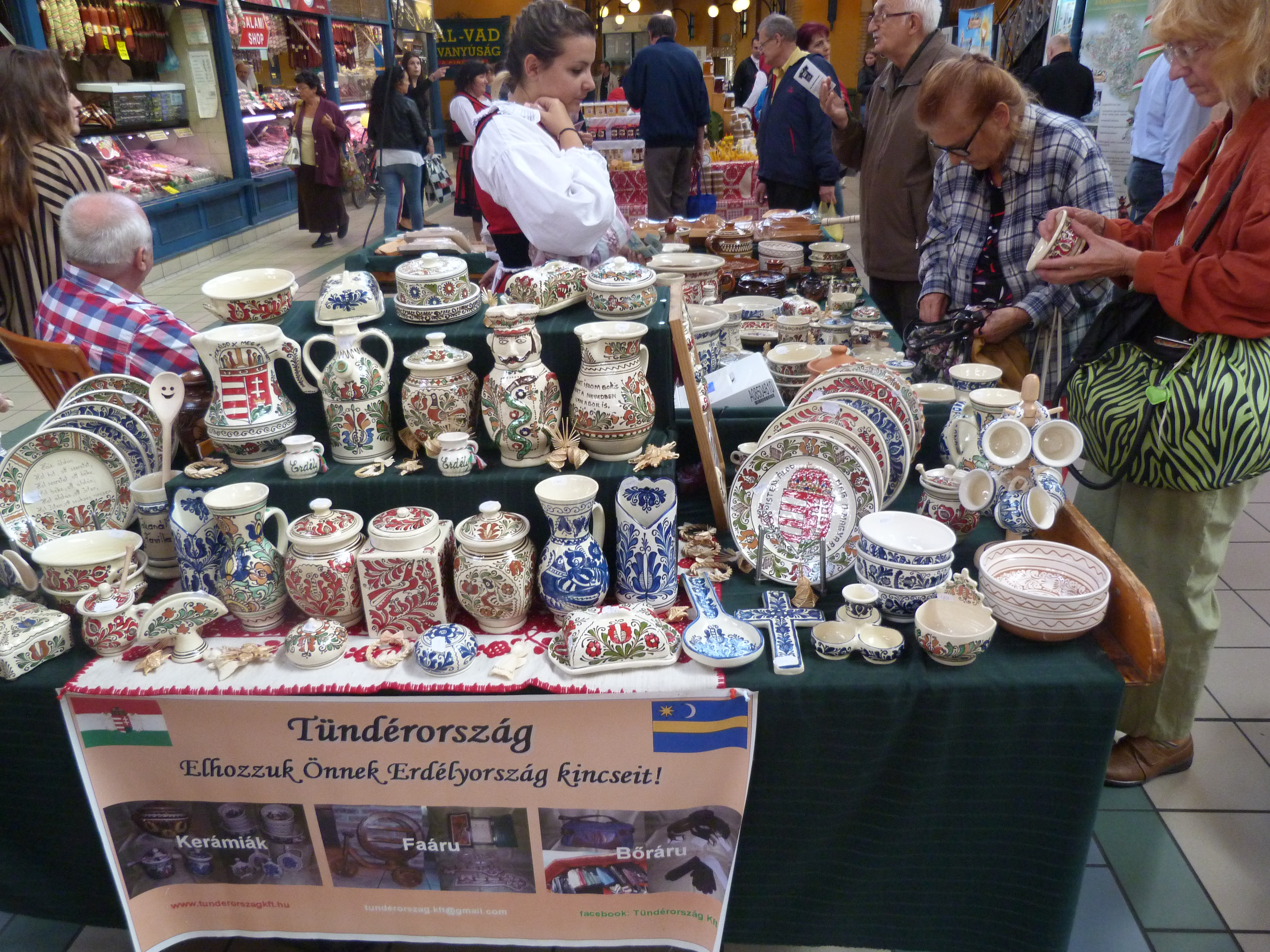
Traditional styles of faience pottery from Székely Land, now in Romania, on sale in Budapest, Hungary in 2014. A conventional idea of folk art, though no doubt made in quasi-industrial conditions.

Folk art covers all forms of visual art made in the context of folk culture. Definitions vary, but generally the objects have practical utility of some kind, rather than being exclusively decorative. The makers of folk art are typically trained within a popular tradition, rather than in the fine art tradition of the culture. There is often overlap, or contested ground with "naive art." "Folk art" is not used in regard to traditional societies where ethnographic art continue to be made.

The types of objects covered by the term "folk art" vary. The art form is categorised as "divergent... of cultural production ... comprehended by its usage in Europe, where the term originated, and in the United States, where it developed for the most part along very different lines."

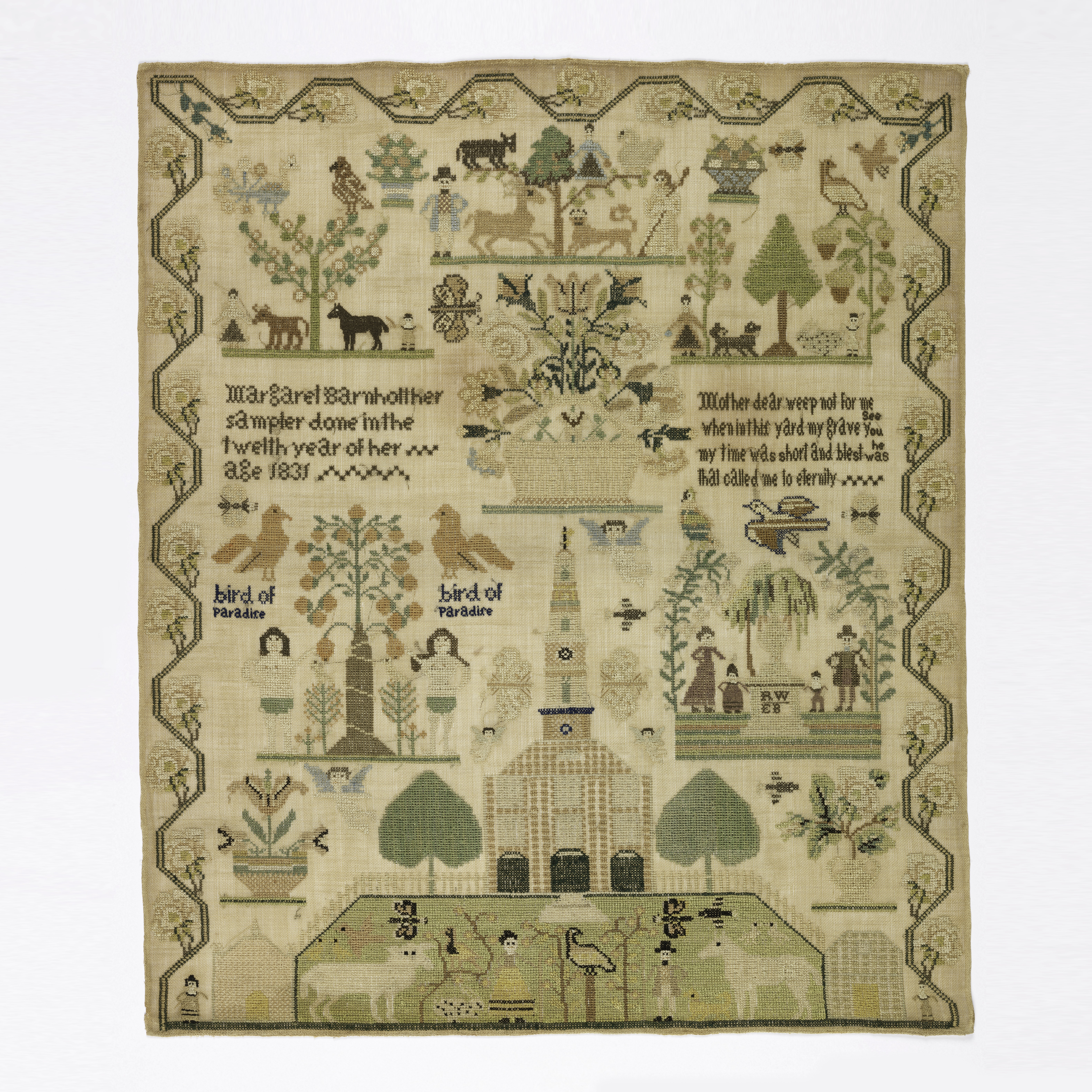
American sampler, 1831

From a European perspective, Edward Lucie-Smith described it as "Unsophisticated art, both fine and applied, which is supposedly rooted in the collective awareness of simple people. The concept of folk art is a distinctly 19th-century one. Today it carries with it a tinge of nostalgia for pre-industrial society."

Folk arts, which include both performance and tangible arts, reflect the cultural life of a community associated with the fields of folklore and cultural heritage. Tangible folk art can include objects which historically are crafted and used within a traditional community. Intangible folk arts can include such forms as music and art galleries, dance and narrative structures.

== Characteristics of folk art objects ==
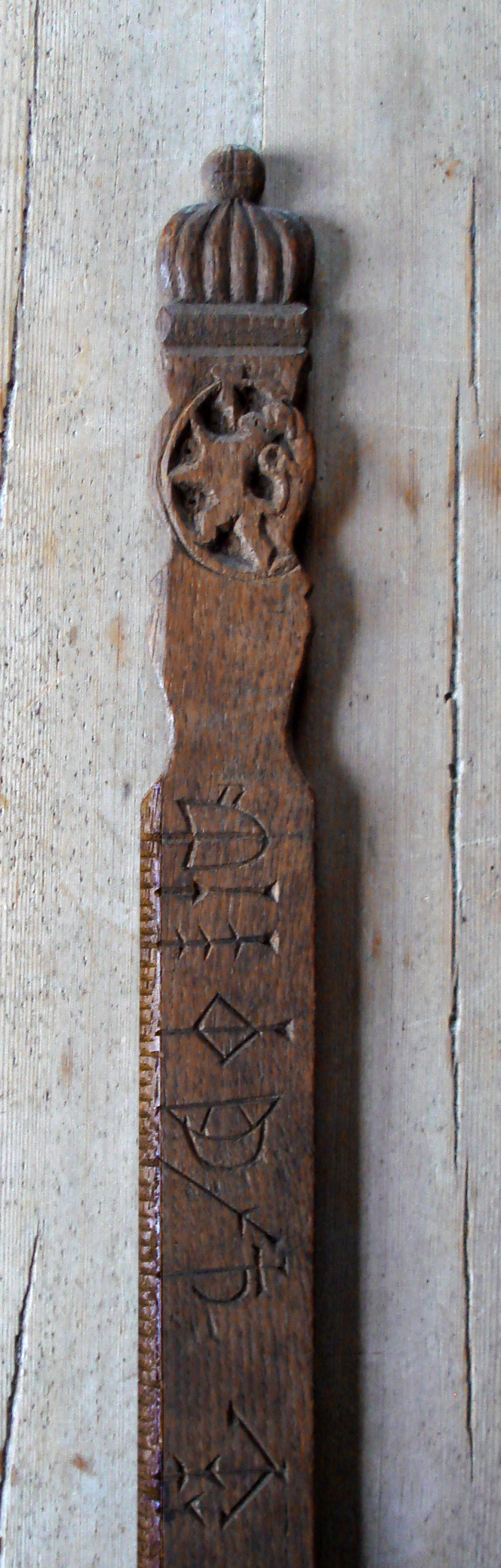
Detail of 17th century calendar stick carved with national coat of arms, a common motif in Norwegian folk art.

Objects of folk art are a subset of material culture and include objects which are experienced through the senses, by seeing and touching. Typical for material culture in art, these tangible objects can be handled, repeatedly re-experienced, and sometimes broken. They are considered works of art because of the technical execution of an existing form and design; the skill might be seen in the precision of the form, the surface decoration or in the beauty of the finished product. As a folk art, these objects share several characteristics that distinguish them from other artifacts of material culture.

=== Folk artists ===
The object is created by a single artisan or team of artisans. The craft-person works within an established cultural framework. The folk art has a recognizable style and method in crafting its pieces, which allows products to be recognized and attributed to a single individual or workshop. This was originally articulated by Alois Riegl in his study of Volkskunst, Hausfleiss, und Hausindustrie, published in 1894. "Riegl ... stressed that the individual hand and intentions of the artist were significant, even in folk creativity. To be sure, the artist may have been obliged by group expectations to work within the norms of transmitted forms and conventions, but individual creativity – which implied personal aesthetic choices and technical virtuosity – saved received or inherited traditions from stagnating and permitted them to be renewed in each generation." Individual innovation in the production process plays an important role in the continuance of these traditional forms. Many folk art traditions like quilting, ornamental picture framing, and decoy carving continue to be practiced, and new forms continue to emerge.

Contemporary outsider artists are often self-taught, and their work is usually developed in isolation or in small communities across the country. The Smithsonian American Art Museum houses over 70 folk and self-taught artists.

=== Hand crafted ===
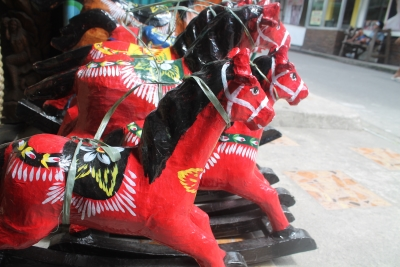
The taka is a type of paper mache art native to Paete in the Philippines.

Folk art objects are usually produced in a one-off production process. Only one object is made at a time, either by hand or in a combination of hand and machine methods, and are not mass-produced. As a result of manual production, individual pieces are considered to be unique and usually can be differentiated from other objects of the same type. In his essay on "Folk Objects", folklorist Simon Bronner references preindustrial modes of production, but folk art objects continue to be made as unique crafted pieces by folk artisans. "The notion of folk objects tends to emphasize the handmade over machine manufactured. Folk objects imply a mode of production common to preindustrial communal society where knowledge and skills were personal and traditional." Folk art does not need to be old; it continues to be hand-crafted today in many regions around the world.

=== Workshops and apprentices ===
The design and production of folk art is learned and taught informally or formally; folk artists are not self-taught. Folk art does not aim for individualistic expression. Instead, "the concept of group art implies, indeed requires, that artists acquire their abilities, both manual and intellectual, at least in part from communication with others. The community has something, usually a great deal, to say about what passes for acceptable folk art." Historically, the training in a handicraft was done as apprenticeships with local craftsmen, such as the blacksmith or the stonemason. As the equipment and tools needed were no longer readily available in the community, these traditional crafts moved into technical schools or applied arts schools.

Teaching of the craft through informal means outside of institutions has opened the genre to artists who may face barrier to entry in other disciplines. Canadian folk artist Maud Lewis, for example, suffered from an undiagnosed congenital illness, making formal art schooling a challenge. Despite barriers to formal education, Lewis became one of Canada's most famous folk artists, creating thousands of paintings of life in Nova Scotia.

=== Owned by the community ===
The object is recognizable within its cultural framework as being of a known type. Similar objects can be found in the environment made by other individuals which resemble this object. Individual pieces of folk art will reference other works in the culture, even as they show exceptional individual execution in form or design. If antecedents cannot be found for this object, it might still be a piece of art but it is not folk art. "While traditional society does not erase ego, it does focus and direct the choices that an individual can acceptably make… the well-socialized person will find the limits are not inhibiting but helpful… Where traditions are healthy the works of different artists are more similar than they are different; they are more uniform than personal." Tradition in folk art emerges through the passing of information from one generation to another. Through generations of family lines, family members pass down the knowledge, information, skills and tools needed to continue the creation of one's folk art. Examples are Leon "Peck" Clark, a Mississippi basket maker, who learned his skills from a community member; George Lopez of Cordova, New Mexico, who is a sixth-generation santos carver whose children also carve; and the Yorok-Karok basket weavers, who explain that relatives generally taught them to weave."

=== Utility of the object ===
The known type of the object must be, or have originally been, utilitarian; it was created to serve some function in the daily life of the household or the community. This is the reason the design continues to be made. Since the form itself had function and purpose, it was duplicated over time in various locations by different individuals. A book on the history of art states that "every man-made thing arises from a problem as a purposeful solution." Written by George Kubler and published in 1962, "The Shape of Time: Remarks on the History of Things" describes an approach to historical change which places the history of objects and images in a larger continuum of time. The purpose of folk art is not purely decorative or aimed to have duplicated handicraft. However, since the form itself was a distinct type with its function and purpose, folk art has continued to be copied over time by different individuals.

=== Aesthetics of the genre ===
The object is recognized as being exceptional in the form and decorative motifs. Being part of the community, the craftsperson is reflecting on the community's cultural aesthetics, and may take into consideration the community's response to the handicraft. An object can be created to match the community's expectations, and the artist may design the product with unspoken cultural biases to reflect this aim. While the shared form indicates a shared culture, innovation can enable the individual artisan to embody their own vision. This can be a representation of manipulating collective and individual culture, within the traditional folk art production. "For art to progress, its unity must be dismantled so that certain of its aspects can be freed for exploration, while others shrink from attention." This dichotomous representation of the culture is typically visible in the final product.

== Materials, forms, and crafts ==
Folk art is designed in different shapes, sizes and forms. It traditionally uses the materials which are at hand in the locality and reproduces familiar shapes and forms. The Smithsonian Center for Folklife and Cultural Heritage has compiled a page of storied objects that have been part of one of their annual folklife festivals. The list below includes a sampling of different materials, forms, and artisans involved in the production of everyday and folk art objects.

- Alebrije
- Armourer
- Basketry
- Bellmaker
- Blacksmith
- Boat building
- Brickmaker
- Broommaker
- Cabinetry
- Carpentry
- Ceramics
- Chillum
- Clockmaker
- Cooper
- Coppersmith
- Cutler
- Decoy carving
- Drystone mason
- Ex-voto
- Farrier
- Foodways
- Fraktur
- Furniture
- Gunsmith
- Harness maker
- Ironwork
- Jewelry
- Kuthiyottam
- Latin American retablos
- Leather crafting
- Lei (garland)
- Ljuskrona
- Locksmith
- Lubok
- Madhubani painting
- Masonry
- Metalworking
- Millwright
- Miniatures or Models
- Nakshi Kantha
- Needlework
- Origami
- Painting
- Pewterer
- Phad painting
- Quilting
- Recycled materials
- Ropemaker
- Saddler
- Sawsmith
- Sculpture
- Shoemaker
- Spooner
- Stonemason
- Tanner
- Textiles
- Thatcher
- Tile maker
- Tinker
- Tinsmith
- Truck art in South Asia
- Tools
- Toys
- Treenwaren
- Turning
- Vernacular architecture
- Wainwright
- Weaver
- Wheelwright
- Whirligig
- Wood carving

== Related terminology ==
Listed below are a wide-ranging assortment of labels for an eclectic group of art works. All of these genres are created outside of the institutional structures of the art world, and are not considered "fine art". There is overlap between these labeled collections, such that an object might be listed under two or more labels. Many of these groupings and individual objects might also resemble "folk art" in its aspects, however may not align to the defining characteristics outlined above.

- Americana
- Art brut
- Folk Environments
- Genre paintings
- Naïve art
- Outlier art
- Outsider art
- Primitive art
- Tramp art
- Trench art
- Tribal art
- Vanguard art
- Vernacular art
- Visionary art

== Influence on mainstream art ==
Folk artworks, styles and motifs have inspired various artists. For example, Pablo Picasso was inspired by African tribal sculptures and masks. Natalia Goncharova and others were inspired by traditional Russian popular prints called luboks.

In 1951, artist, writer and curator Barbara Jones organised the exhibition Black Eyes and Lemonade at the Whitechapel Gallery in London as part of the Festival of Britain. This exhibition, along with her publication The Unsophisticated Arts, exhibited folk and mass-produced consumer objects alongside contemporary art in an early instance of the popularisation of pop art in Britain.

== Supporting organizations ==
The United Nations recognizes and supports cultural heritage around the world, in particular UNESCO in partnership with the International Organization of Folk Art (IOV). Their declared mission is to "further folk art, customs and culture around the world through the organization of festivals and other cultural events, … with emphasis on dancing, folk music, folk songs and folk art." By supporting international exchanges of folk art groups as well as the organization of festivals and other cultural events, their goal is promote international understanding and world peace.

In the United States, the National Endowment for the Arts works to promote greater understanding and sustainability of cultural heritage across the United States and around the world through research, education, and community engagement. As part of this, they identify and support NEA folk art fellows in quilting, ironwork, woodcarving, pottery, embroidery, basketry, weaving, along with other related traditional arts. The NEA guidelines define as criteria for this award a display of "authenticity, excellence, and significance within a particular tradition" for the artists selected. (NEA guidelines) ." In 1966, the NEA's first year of funding, support for national and regional folk festivals was identified as a priority with the first grant made in 1967 to the National Folk Festival Association. Folklife festivals are celebrated around the world to encourage and support the education and community engagement of diverse ethnic communities.

== Regional folk arts ==
- African folk art
- Chinese folk art
- Mingei (Japanese folk art movement)
- Minhwa (Korean folk art)
- Mak Yong (Northern Malay Peninsular folk art dance)
- Mexican handcrafts and folk art
- Joget (Wider Malay folk art dance)
- North Malabar
- Peruvian folk art
- Theyyam
- Tribal art
- Warli painting (India)
- Folk arts of Karnataka (India)
- Native American Art
- Folk art of the United States

- Appalachian folk art

== Associations ==
- Folk Art Society of America
- IOV International Organization of Folk Art, in partnership with UNESCO
- National Endowment for the Arts
- CIOFF: International Council of Organizations of Folklore Festivals and Folk Arts
- Pennsylvania Folklore: Woven Together TV Program on textile arts
- National Folk Organization
- International Organization of Folk Art (IOV)

== Museums and collections ==
- American Folk Art Museum
- Smithsonian American Art Museum
- Folk Art Center and Guild, Asheville NC
- Folk Art and Ethnological Museum of Macedonia and Thrace
- Folk Art Museum of Patras, Greece
- Museum of International Folk Art
- Abby Aldrich Rockefeller Folk Art Museum
- Shelburne Museum

== See also ==
- Alebrije
- African folk art
- American Folk Art Museum
- Chester Cornett
- Chillum
- Chinese folk art
- Ex-voto
- Guy Cobb
- John William "Uncle Jack" Dey
- Juliana R. Force
- Kuthiyottam
- Latin American Retablos
- Ljuskrona
- Lubok
- Madhubani painting
- Mingei (Japanese folk art movement)
- Minhwa (Korean folk art)
- Museum folklore
- Naïve art
- Nakshi Kantha
- Nose art
- North Malabar
- Outsider art
- Phad painting
- Pakistani vehicle art
- Pasaquan
- Rebecca Couch
- Rural crafts
- Theyyam
- Thidambu Nritham
- Tramp art
- Tribal art
- Vaillancourt Folk Art
- Warli painting
- Whirligig
- Wire craft
- Yakshagana
- Czech folklore
