= Folk arts =

Performance and visual arts rooted in the cultural life of a community

Folk and traditional arts are rooted in and reflective of the cultural life of a community. They encompass the body of expressive culture associated with the fields of folklore and cultural heritage. Tangible folk art includes objects which historically are crafted and used within a traditional community. Intangible folk arts include such forms as music, dance and narrative structures. Each of these arts, both tangible and intangible, was originally developed to address a real need. Once this practical purpose has been lost or forgotten, there is no reason for further transmission unless the object or action has been imbued with meaning beyond its initial practicality. These vital and constantly reinvigorated artistic traditions are shaped by values and standards of excellence that are passed from generation to generation, most often within family and community, through demonstration, conversation, and practice.

Folklorists and cultural historians study both the tangible and intangible cultural artifacts of communities. Researcher seek to understand the significance of cultural forms within the community by studying their creation, transmission and performance, through which the values and structure of the community are expressed. Documenting these traditional acts and their meaning is important for preserving cultural knowledge, allowing community members and outsiders to be educated on the importance of traditional objects and actions within the life of the community. Public knowledge of these arts allows for an active demonstration and celebration of identity for these communities.

== Performance folk arts ==
In addition to tangible folk art objects, there is a second broad category of performance folk art which includes intangible arts forms such as folk music and folk song, folk dance and various kinds of narrative structures. This category is part of the performing arts. These intangible folk art forms only became grouped as such in the second half of the 20th century, when the two terms "folklore performance" and "text and context" dominated discussions among folklorists. Performance is frequently tied to verbal and customary lore, whereas context is used in discussions of material lore. Both formulations offer different perspectives on the same folkloric understanding, specifically that folklore artifacts need to remain embedded in their cultural environment if we are to gain insight into their meaning for the community.

The concept of cultural (folklore) performance is shared with ethnography and anthropology among other social sciences. The cultural anthropologist Victor Turner identified four universal characteristics of cultural performance. These are playfulness, framing, using symbolic language and employing the subjunctive mood. In performance the audience leaves the daily reality to move into a mode of make-believe, "what if". That this fits well with all types of verbal lore, music, and movement, where reality finds little footing among the symbols, fantasies, and nonsense of traditional tales, proverbs, and jokes is self-evident. Customs and the lore of children and games also fit easily into the language of a folklore performance.

- Children's folklore
- Folk dance
- Folk music
- Folk song
- Game studies

== Supporting organizations ==
The United Nations recognizes and supports cultural heritage around the world, in particular with the IOV International Organization of Folk Art, in partnership with UNESCO. Their declared mission is to "further folk art, customs and culture around the world through the organization of festivals and other cultural events, … with emphasis on dancing, folk music, folk songs and folk art." By supporting international exchanges of folk art groups as well as the organization of festivals and other cultural events, their goal is promote international understanding and world peace.

In the United States, the National Endowment for the Arts works to promote greater understanding and sustainability of cultural heritage across the United States and around the world through research, education, and community engagement. As part of this, they identify and support NEA folk art fellows in quilting, ironwork, woodcarving, pottery, embroidery, basketry, weaving, along with other related traditional arts. The NEA guidelines define as criteria for this award a display of "authenticity, excellence, and significance within a particular tradition" for the artists selected. (NEA guidelines) ." In 1966, the NEA's first year of funding, support for national and regional folk festivals was identified as a priority with the first grant made in 1967 to the National Folk Festival Association. Folklife festivals have long been celebrated around the world to encourage and support the education and community engagement of diverse ethnic communities.

== Regional folk arts ==
- African folk art
- Chinese folk art
- Mingei (Japanese folk art movement)
- Minhwa (Korean folk art)
- North Malabar
- Theyyam
- Tribal art
- Warli painting (India)
- Folk arts of Karnataka (India)
- Folk Art and Ethnological Museum of Macedonia and Thrace
- Folk Art Museum of Patras, Greece
- Native American Art

== Associations ==
- Folk Art Society of America
- IOV International Organization of Folk Art, in partnership with UNESCO
- National Endowment for the Arts
