= Helaine =

Helaine is a given name. Notable people with the name include:

- Helaine M. Barnett, American legal aid attorney and law professor
- Helaine Blumenfeld (born 1942), American sculptor, especially of large-scale public sculptures
- Candace Helaine Cameron Bure (born 1976), American actress and former talk show panelist
- Helaine Fendelman (born 1942), antiques, fine arts and collectibles appraiser and author
- Helaine Greenfeld (born 1963), American attorney
- Helaine Head (born 1947), American film, television, and theatre director
- Helaine Newstead (1906–1981), American scholar of medieval literature
- Helaine Olen, American journalist and author
- Helaine Selin (born 1946), American librarian, historian of science, author, book editor
