= National Folk Organization =

Organization for folk arts in the United States

The National Folk Organization of the United States of America (NFO) is an organization that seeks to unify both individuals and organizations interested in maintaining and enjoying folk arts in the United States.

== History ==
NFO was founded in 1986 by Vytautas F. Beliajus, Mary Bee Jensen, George Frandsen, and L. DeWayne Young to make information about and opportunities in the folk arts around the United States available to members. The organization has membership in 50 states including well-known folk festivals in the United States.

== Activities ==
NFO hold an annual conference to promote activities relating to the folk arts as well as unify individuals and organizations with interest in the folk arts. They also sponsor "Pourparlair", a seminar for music and dance teachers from across the United States, to exchange dances from around the world. The present a number of awards each year, including the "Preserving Our Legacy" award.
