= Helaine Fendelman =

American antiques expert (born 1942)

- Born: January 25, 1942 (age 84); Riverside, Illinois
- Occupations: Antiques expert and television personality
- Spouse: Burton Fendelman

Helaine Fendelman (born January 25, 1942; Riverside, Illinois) is a generalist antiques, fine arts and collectibles appraiser, author, instructor and co-host of a PBS affiliated television show.

== Early life and education ==
Fendelman earned a bachelor's degree of Arts in English from Washington University in St. Louis in 1964 followed by a master's degree of Arts in English from C.W. Post Campus of Long Island University in 1967.

== Antiques career ==
Fendelman has more than 30 years of experience in arts and antiques. In 1965, Fendelman and her husband, Burton Fendelman moved to New York City. In 1975, she began her career in the arts as a curator at the American Folk Art Museum.

From 1978 to 1981, Fendelman was a curator at the Rye Historical Society in Rye, New York.

In 1994, Fendelman created Helaine Fendelman & Associates, a Fine Arts, antiques, and appraisal firm, which is located in the Gramercy Park section of New York City. Fendelman is also an instructor at New York University’s Appraisal Institute. She has two sons and lives in New York City and Sanibel, Florida.

Since 1997, Fendelman has co-hosted the PBS television show, “Treasures in your Attic” and co-authored the Scripps Howard Syndicated newspaper column, “Treasures in Your Attic.”

Fendelman served as a board member of the Appraisers Association of America from 1984 to 2008, as vice president from 1994 to 1996 and as president from 1996 to 1998.

She has also authored and co-authored several books about appraising including: All About Appraising: The Definitive Appraisal Handbook; Price it Yourself, Treasures In Your Attic; Tramp Art A Folk Art Phenomenon; Silent Companions: Dummy Board Figures of the 17th Through 19th Centuries, and The Official Identification and Price Guides to American Folk Art and Holiday Collectibles.
