= African folk art =

Folk art and pottery from the continent of Africa

African folk art consists of a variety of items: household objects, metal objects, toys, textiles, masks, and wood sculpture. Most traditional African art meets many definitions of folk art generally, or at least did so until relatively recent dates.

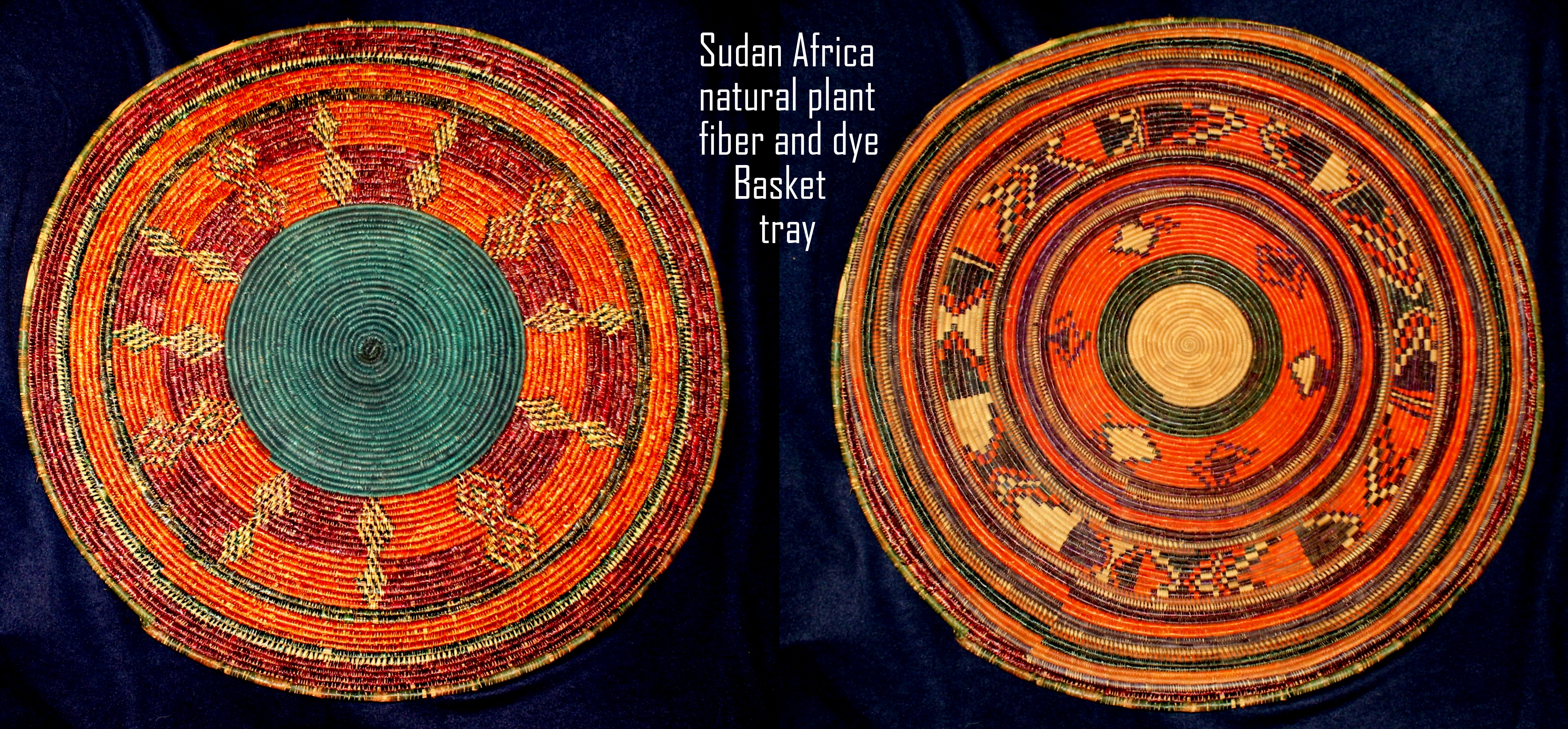
SUDAN basket -tray, tabar of weaved natural plant fibre, coloured in different colours

== Metal objects ==
Much African folk art consists of metal objects due in part to the cultural status of forging as a "process that is likened to the creation of life itself." While in the past ceremonial pieces were exchanged as part of social rituals (i.e. marriage), today in Senegal, metal objects are recycled as utilitarian African folk art.

=== Jewellery ===
In West Africa, the Asante are popular for their crafts and trade in gold. For the people of Ghana, not only does the colour gold represent wealth and status but there is also belief that it is a protection to whoever wears it. Necklaces have been made of gold bells, disks, and cross-shaped beads for those to wear around the neck. In the Akan culture, each of these elements are made by getting shaped in wax then covering it with a heat resistance mould to form around the wax. After this process, the mould is heated meanwhile the wax melts in order for the melted gold to take its place. The gold is left to be cooled so that the mould can be taken apart to reveal its shine of gold. It is stated that the most important part of this necklace is a solid gold piece of jewellery that hangs from the neck; with this particular necklace, there is a pendent in the form of a small freshwater crab that is made from mould that's found from a live crab. The crab symbolized the queen mother, meaning this is a way of knowing the royal status of its wearer (Richard B, 36). As mentioned, gold earrings were another form of Africa's most magnificent jewels forms. "One of the most striking forms of jewellery in West Africa are the distinctive, four-leaved earrings worn by Fulani women" states Peter. They add that Fulani woman would have their earrings made larger than their family's wealth would increase to show her fortune and proven her safekeeping. (Richard B, 46). The meaning of each piece of jewellery is considered to be unique. Just by owning one of the pieces, one could depict hope, wisdom, or well-being of its owner (About African Art).

=== Weapons ===
Mini knives were used by the people of Zimbabwe, known as the Shona from southern Africa, to show respect for their ancestors. Most mini weapons were recently found as examples of honouring those who died in guerrilla warfare (Peter, 44). In another resource that'll be given below, offered some more information on weapons that was not displayed in any of the books. This website includes many styles of African Folk Art, including a few that are not discussed in the original article. On here, it is stated that most weapons were made of copper and brass but mainly iron. As you can imagine, most of the weapons included swords, daggers, knives, spears, axes, and other sorts of things; the weapons collected from the end of the nineteenth century and beginnings of the twentieth century could depict the ornaments collected on these weapons, probably to suggest wealth status. The weapons would be blessed at ceremonies then said to have magical powers to protect the warriors at battle. Interestingly enough though, not only were these weapons used for defence or to attack, but many were made of simpler tools by skilled blacksmiths (About African Art).

=== Sculptures ===
Sculptures are important to African folk art because it represents many things such as royalty. These sculptures represent when people are having a difficult time with their religion. The "headdresses called "farming animal hat," represented the mythical antelope, who taught man agriculture" (Davis 1981; 20). There are two different types of headdresses for men and women, for male "has a stylized open-work mane, and for female "has no mane, is depicted with an offspring on her back" (Davis 1981; 20). These headdresses are used for dances and to perform religious rituals. The materials that were used to make sculptures where pigment, wood, glass, wire, encrusted matter, nails, brass, metal, grasses, iron, fibre, and sacrificial materials.

=== Animal art ===
Animal art is "traditions, ancient and modern" by creating what humans see in them and nature. Animal art is made from adults, they built a relationship in understanding both animals and humans. Women have a part in this, for them, are the use of fabric to create patterns from the animals. Animals were seen as an honour, power, and they were a symbol to them. Some common animals they use are crocodiles, elephants, and hornbills. But "while African artists portray some familiar animals (e.g., dogs, horses, rams), they tend to concentrate on curious menagerie of aardvarks and antelopes, bats and buffalo, pangolins, snakes, spiders, spotted cat, and a few others deemed meaningful and behaviour (Roberts 1995; 17). The animals they used to create their type of animal art are not just the common animals we know from film. The reason they create art with these types of animals is because of the details, and the "natural symbols". They represent "leadership, healing, divination, problem-solving, rites of passage, and rituals" (Roberts 1995; 16). They create this artwork on walls, craving on drums, masks, and pots. In creating this type of artwork shows them where they come from and how nature is important to them.

== Pottery ==
During the tenth millennium BP, pottery was developed throughout the southern Sahara and the Sahel. Along with basketry vessels, pottery was essential for storing and transporting goods. Zambian pottery is particularly known for its geometric patterns.

== Baskets ==
In the Zulu culture, specifically in the early 1800s, a chief named Shaka established the Zulu state by uniting smaller cultures of Southern Africa. In the early nineteenth century, growing tobacco had already been popular among them because of importation from the Americas in the 1600s. At this time, the crop was to be inserted in the nose and that was the most popular way of using it; this offering to ancestors was a way to appreciate them and show them good manners and respect. For this, culture in particular, containers were made to hold the crop. They were made of small gourds decorated with patterns of wire and belonged mostly to the Zulu men. Furthermore, these containers were passed down from generation to generation to obtain a rich shine of applications of oil. It is stated that, "People of the Zulu culture admire elegant design and fine craftsmanship in everyday object serving dishes, tools and utensils, smoking pipes, and accessory boxes" (Richard B, 50). On the other hand, most traditional African baskets were made of materials like grass and leaves that would be considered textile weaving. They used these baskets oftener than not; it was a way for women to carry food from the market, collect harvested crops, and collecting goods for sale.

== Textiles ==
The Shoowa people, a small population on the northwestern fringe of the Bushoong kingdom, Congo, have created visually delightful and colourful ceremonial panels that combine tradition and innovation in a complex artistic fashion. Despite maintaining a different language and loose political ties, the Shoowa share many cultural practices with the peoples of the Bushoong kingdom.

Ceremonial Panel — 1885–1910

An early example of Shoowa textiles is the Ceremonial Panel. This piece dates from 1885 to 1910, and is 17 in × 59 in (43 cm × 150 cm) in size. This ancient cloth is composed of two pieces joined across the centre; and bordered by pompoms, a technique reported for textiles on the Kongo coast in the seventeenth century. The basic weave is typical for Shoowa with close warps and weft of similar thickness and even distribution. The designs are shaped by two embroidery techniques: lines of stem stitching and cut-pile. To create the plush effect, an embroiderer twists a strand of raffia into an iron needle which she inserts between the warp and weft, leaving a short tuft. After pulling the fibre strand through to about two millimetres in height, she cuts it with a narrow knife held vertically in the same hand and brushes both ends.

Ceremonial Panel — 1910–1930

A second example of the Ceremonial Panel from the Shoowa people, made of woven raffia palm fibre, cut pile and linear embroidery, dating from 1910 to 1930, is 23 in × 24 in (58 cm × 61 cm) in size. This piece is a classic model of quality for a mid-century Shoowa cloth. It retains the major features of the late nineteenth-century style and fine workmanship. Unlike the Bushoong, the Shoowa typically, as here, dye the foundation cloth red before embroidery and execute their designs in natural beige and dark brown. The pattern of two wide columns of interlacing is a long-standing favourite Shoowa theme. The manner in which the broad columnar outlines are formed by multiple dark and light rows of stem stitching, interspersed with tiny light and dark plush motifs, called tunjoko, is another characteristic of Shoowa style. Because of the subtle distribution of light and dark across the surface, there is a convincing sense of balance despite the asymmetry.

Ceremonial Panel — 1950–1975

A third example of the Ceremonial Panel from the Shoowa people, also made of woven raffia palm fiber, cut-pile and linear embroidery, dating from 1950 to 1975, is 24" × 4 1/4" (60.96 cm × 61.28 cm) in size. The colourful dots (diamonds, rectangles, triangles) belong to the familiar tiny tunjoko designs seen in many Shoowa cloths. However, here, instead of filling in the intervals between major motifs, they become the principal designs that fill the entire cloth. Intruding upon this dot-filled ground we see a grid of squares drawn by multiple, fine, dark-and-light embroidered lines. In front of this grid two large vertical interlace designs begin at the bottom as thin curved forms and rise criss-crossing to the top.

== Museums ==
The Museum of International Folk Art in Santa Fe, New Mexico, US, has an extensive African Folk Art collection built in part with donations from the private collection Alexander Girard.

A recent acquisition and ongoing collecting area is metalwork from Africa. Metal objects represent a rich area for interpretation because their manufacture and use encompasses the development of technology, trade, adornment, ritual and religion, and core cultural values.

== See also ==
- Tribal art

== Sources ==
- Monica Blackmun Visonà et al., A History of Art in Africa. New York: Prentice Hall, 2001. ISBN 0-13-442187-6.
- "African Baskets." African Art, All You Want To Know About It., www.all-about-african-art.com/african-baskets.html
- Stepan, Peter. World Art: Africa. Prestel, 2001.
- Vogel, Susan, and Ima Ebong. Africa Explores: 20th-Century African Art. Center for African Art, 1994.
- Woodward, Richard B. African Art: Virginia Museum of Fine Arts. The Museum, 2000.
- Roberts, Allen F., et al. Animals in African Art: from the Familiar to the Marvelous. The Museum for African Art, 1995.
- "Baga - Art & Life in Africa - The University of Iowa Museum of Art." Art & Life in Africa - The University of Iowa Stanley Museum of Art, africa.uima.uiowa.edu/peoples/show/Baga.
- Blier, Suzanne Preston. Royal Arts of Africa: the Majesty of Form. L. King, 2012.
- Davis, Charles B. The Animal Motif in Bamana Art. Davis Gallery, 1981.
- Roberts, Allen F., et al. Animals in African Art: from the Familiar to the Marvelous. The Museum for African Art, 1995.
- Willett, Frank, et al. "African Art." Encyclopædia Britannica, Encyclopædia Britannica, Inc., 13 Dec. 2018, www.britannica.com/art/African-art
- Shoowa Design, African Textiles from the Kingdom of Kuba, by Georges Meurant, Thames & Hudson 1986
