= Tramp art =

Style of woodworking

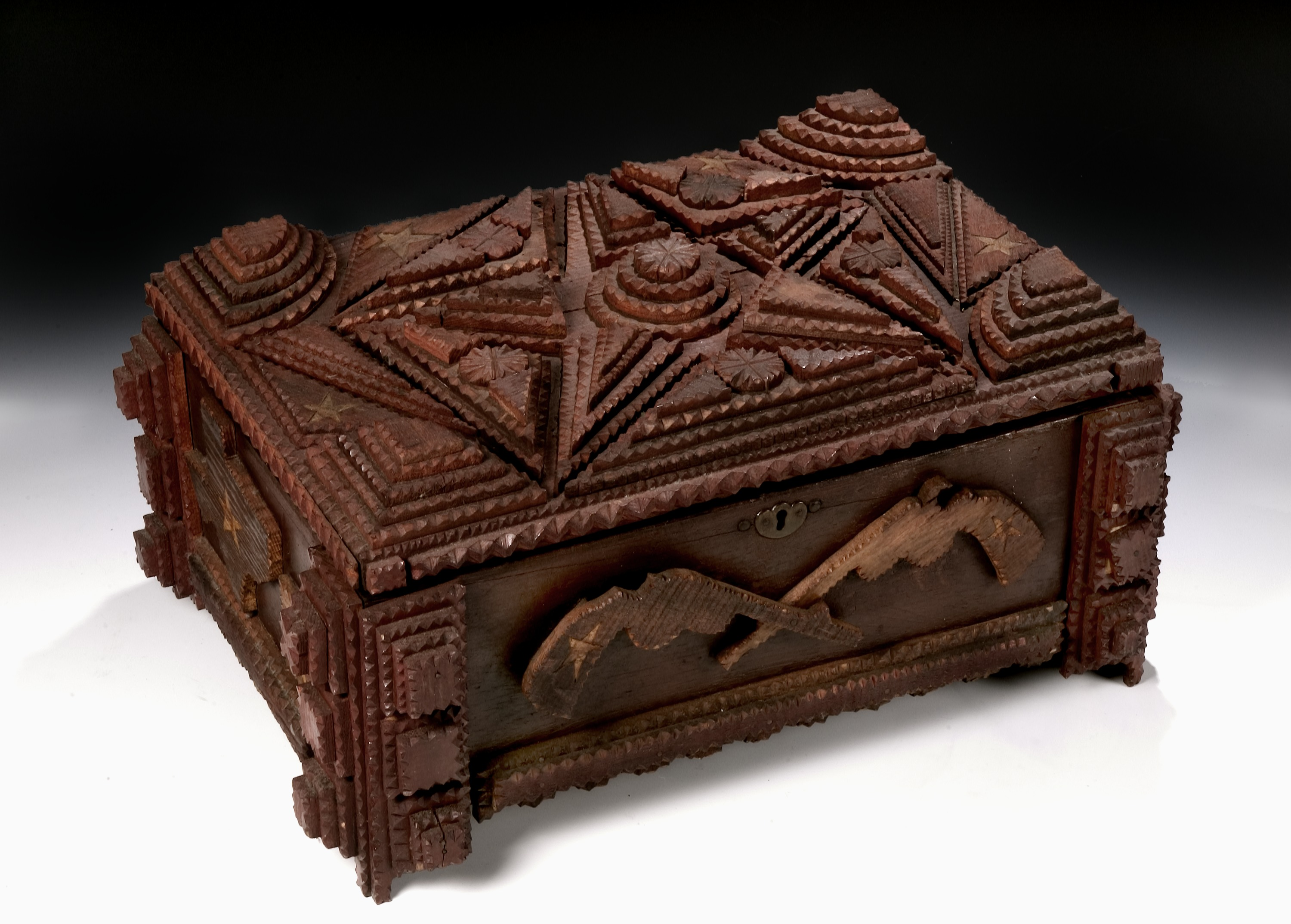
Tramp art box held by the Smithsonian

Tramp art is a style of woodworking which emerged in America in the latter half of the 19th century. Some of tramp art's defining characteristics include chip or notch carving, the reclamation of cheap or available wood such as that from cigar boxes and shipping crates, the use of simple tools such as penknives, and the layering of materials into geometric shapes through glue or nails.

== History ==
Tramp art made with "crown of thorns" technique, also in the Smithsonian

Although widespread use of wooden cigar boxes in the 1850s sparked involvement in tramp art, it was most prevalent during the Great Depression. Tramp art was made around the world but it prospered in the United States. Examples can be found in every state. While the most common forms were the box and the frame, there were objects made in every shape and size, including full sized furniture and objects of whimsy. Techniques included "crown of thorns" construction with interlocking strips of wood.

Tramp art was an art form made of raw materials and typically discarded items. Notable artists include John Martin Zubersky (active c. 1912 – 1920) known for his "Sunflower" work and John Zadzora (active circa 1910) who specialized in expressive wall pockets.

== Origins of the term ==
A 1959 article by Frances Lichten in Pennsylvania Folklife used the term "tramp work" to describe crafts constructed from waste materials such as discarded cigar boxes and assembled with a penknife. Contemporary scholars and art dealers such as Clifford A. Wallach have noted that while this art form may have been practiced among America's itinerant population, it was by no means unique to them and was practiced by factory workers, farmers, and laborers in other occupations.

In 1975 Helaine Fendelman published the first book on tramp art, Tramp Art an Itinerant's Folk Art. The book acted as a catalog to the first museum show on the art form sponsored by the American Folk Art Museum. In 2017, the Museum of International Folk Art put on an exhibition that highlighted the enduring nature and broad reach of tramp art.

== Bibliography ==
Books on tramp art:

- Helaine Fendelman (1975). Tramp Art, An Itinerant's Folk Art. New York: E. P. Dutton & CO.
- Clifford A Wallach and Michael Cornish (1998). Tramp Art, One Notch at a Time. New York: Wallach-Irons.
- Helaine Fendelman and Jonathan Taylor (1999). Tramp Art A Folk Art Phenomenon. NY: Stewart, Tabori & Chang.
- Clifford A Wallach (2009). Tramp Art Another Notch, Folk Art from the Heart. Atglen, PA: Schiffer Publishing Ltd.
- Clifford A Wallach (2012). A Legacy in Tramp Art. Atglen, Pa: Schiffer Publishing Ltd.

== See also ==
- Folk art
