= Velours du Kasaï =

Textile fabric made in Kasai, Democratic Republic of the Congo

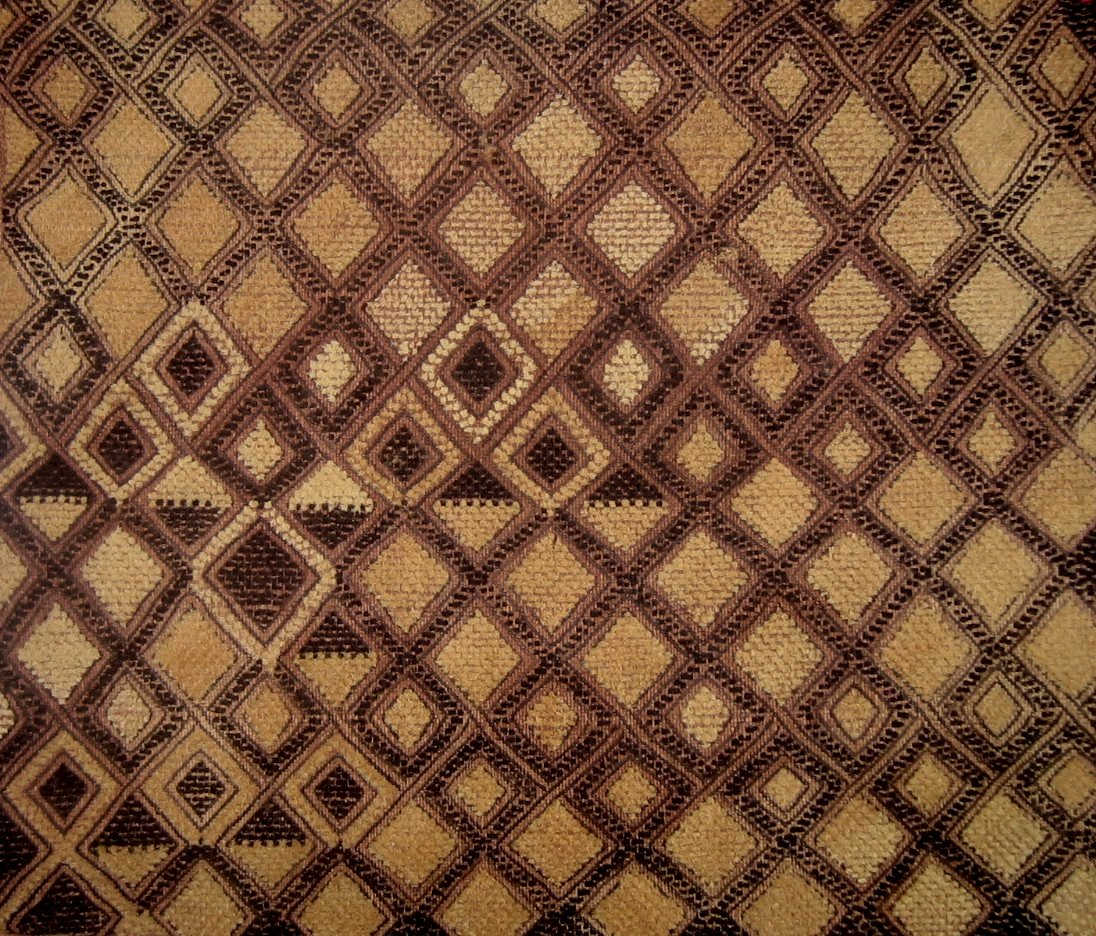
Velours du Kasaï

Velours du Kasaï (Kasaï velvet) is a kind of textile fabric made in Kasai, a province in the Democratic Republic of the Congo (Zaïre). Traditionally, the weaving is done by men of the Shoowa from the Kuba ethnic group, while the embroidery is reserved to women. Ideally, the embroiderers should be pregnant. The technique is still practised.

Originally, the cloth was made using beaten wood bark; however, since the introduction of raffia, only vestiges of this remain. Some belts (duun) are still made in bark; they symbolize power and may be worn only by certain nobles. Bark is still used for certain loincloths for women (Ishyeen). The center of these loincloths is formed of many triangles of bark, alternately black and white. These are cut out of the raw bark either natural, or dyed black and sewn together. The choice of this method rather than that of drawing is significant - for the Kuba, value is measured by a work's difficulty.

The fabric is made of very fine fibre from the inside of the leaves of young palm trees. The leaves are dried in the sun, then split along their length and connected to form a basic warp of raffia, from 2m to 4m in length. Fine leaf fibres are then interweaved in a woof to create the velvet effect. This is then wrapped around the waist to create a loincloth known as Mapel (for men) or Ntshak (for women).

The designs are very varied and are created spontaneously but normally follow the body scarification patterns of the Kuba.

The cloth is heavy and expensive and is not normally intended to be worn, but is used as a bed covering or on the royal throne. Individual items take from several months to a year to produce. Cloths were used as currency or given as gifts.

== Gallery ==
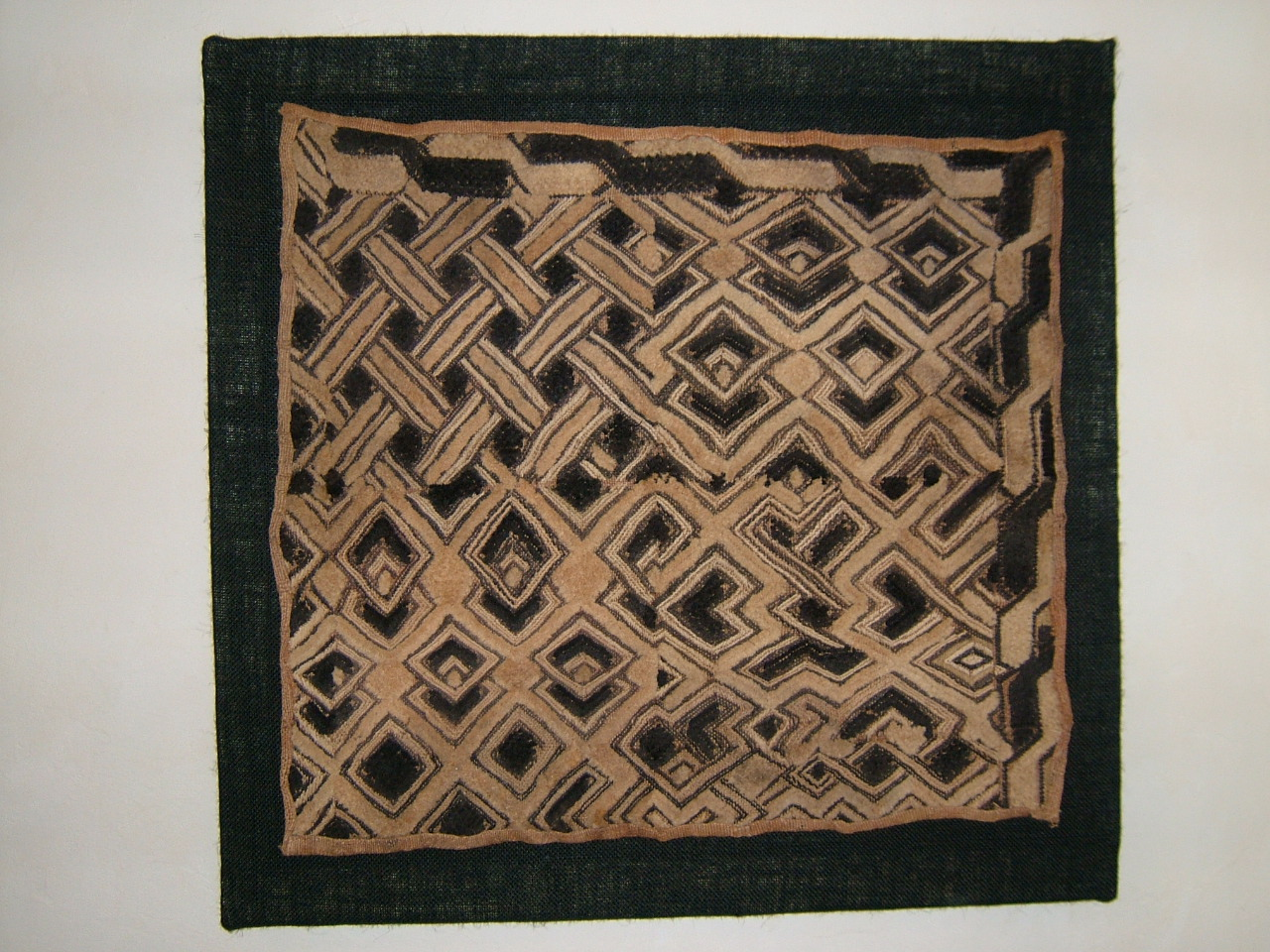

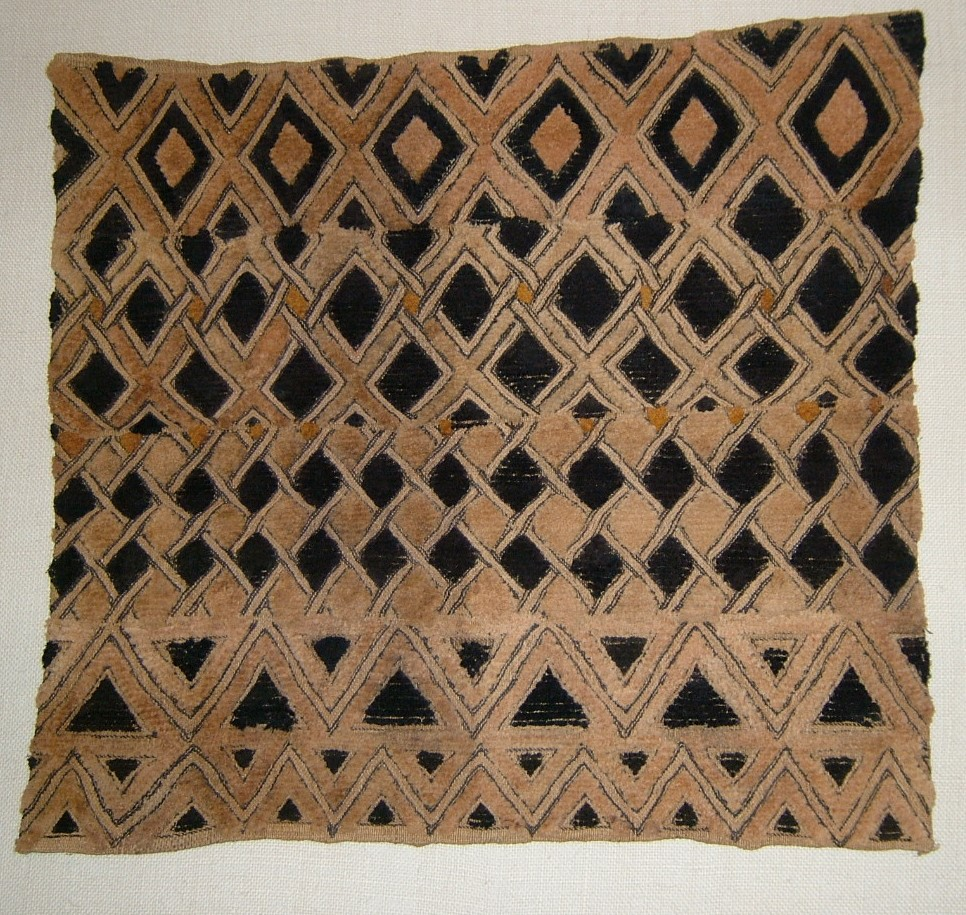

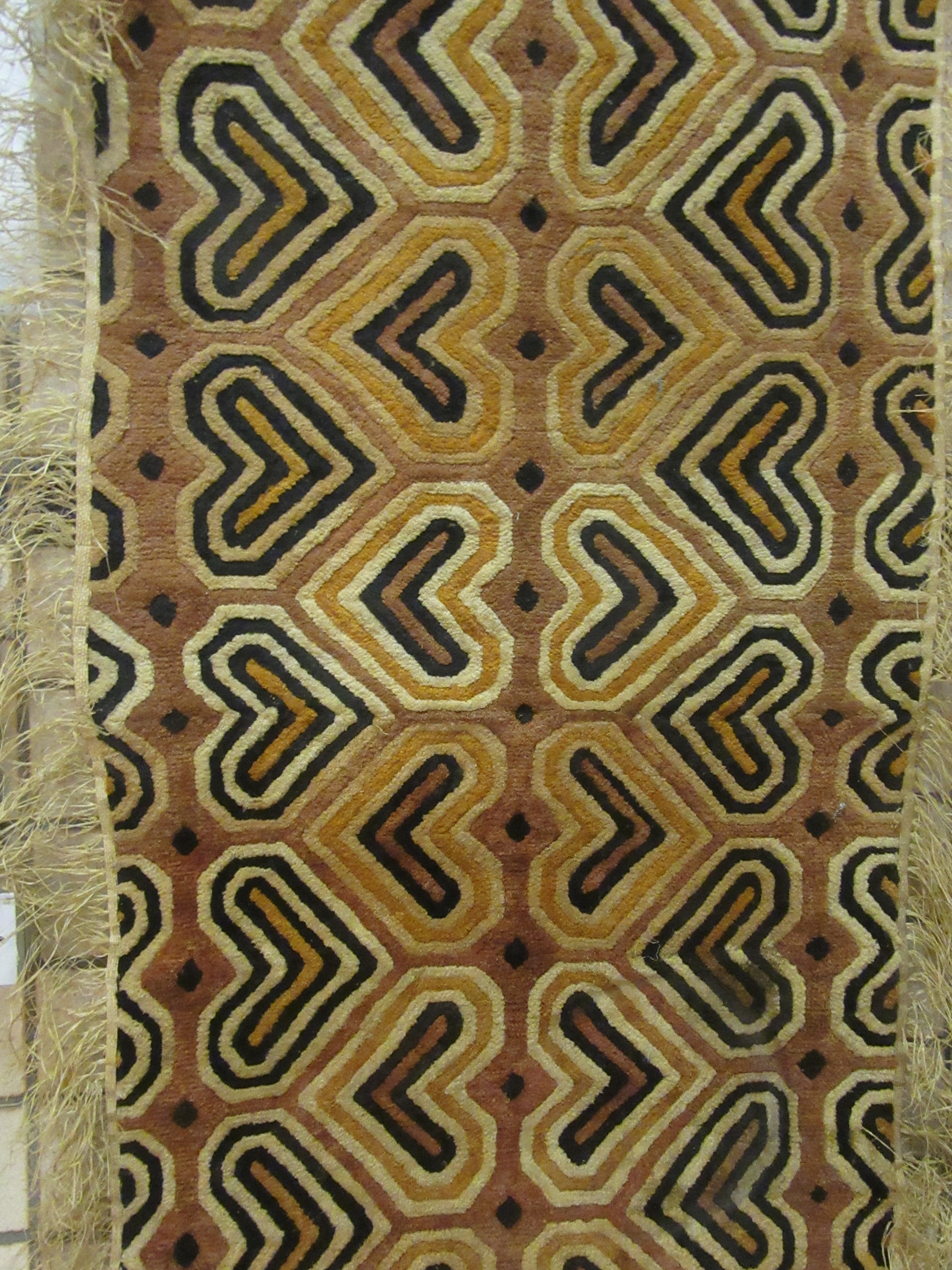
