= Chester Cornett =

American chair maker

Chester Cornett (1913–1981) was an American chair-maker and artisan. His work has been the subject of monographic treatment both by regional museums and the University of Kentucky Press.

Cornett's grandfather, Cal Foutch, taught him chairmaking. Cornett worked in many styles: "pegged and slat-backed armchairs, rockers, and folding chairs from a variety of local woods, weaving seats from hickory bark." The 1981 documentary film Hand Carved by Appalshop features Cornett's chair-building process. The eight-legged, two-in-one rocker created over the course of the film was loaned by Appalshop to KFAC for its 2014 traveling exhibit.

Cornett's work "Crucifix" is in the collection of the American Folk Art Museum. According to Cornett, he dreamed in 1968 that Eastern Kentucky would experience a biblical flood. He decided to prepare for it by building an ark. Cornett built the ark, but it was destroyed in a storm. What remained was a 20 foot long crucifix that he had carved for the bow. After moving to Cincinnati, Ohio, Cornett donated the cross to the museum

In 2014, Kentucky Folk Art Center ("KFAC") presented the first comprehensive exhibition of Cornett's work, "Chester Cornett: Beyond The Narrow Sky", complete with an extensive, illustrated catalogue.
