= Pew group =

18th century English pottery figures

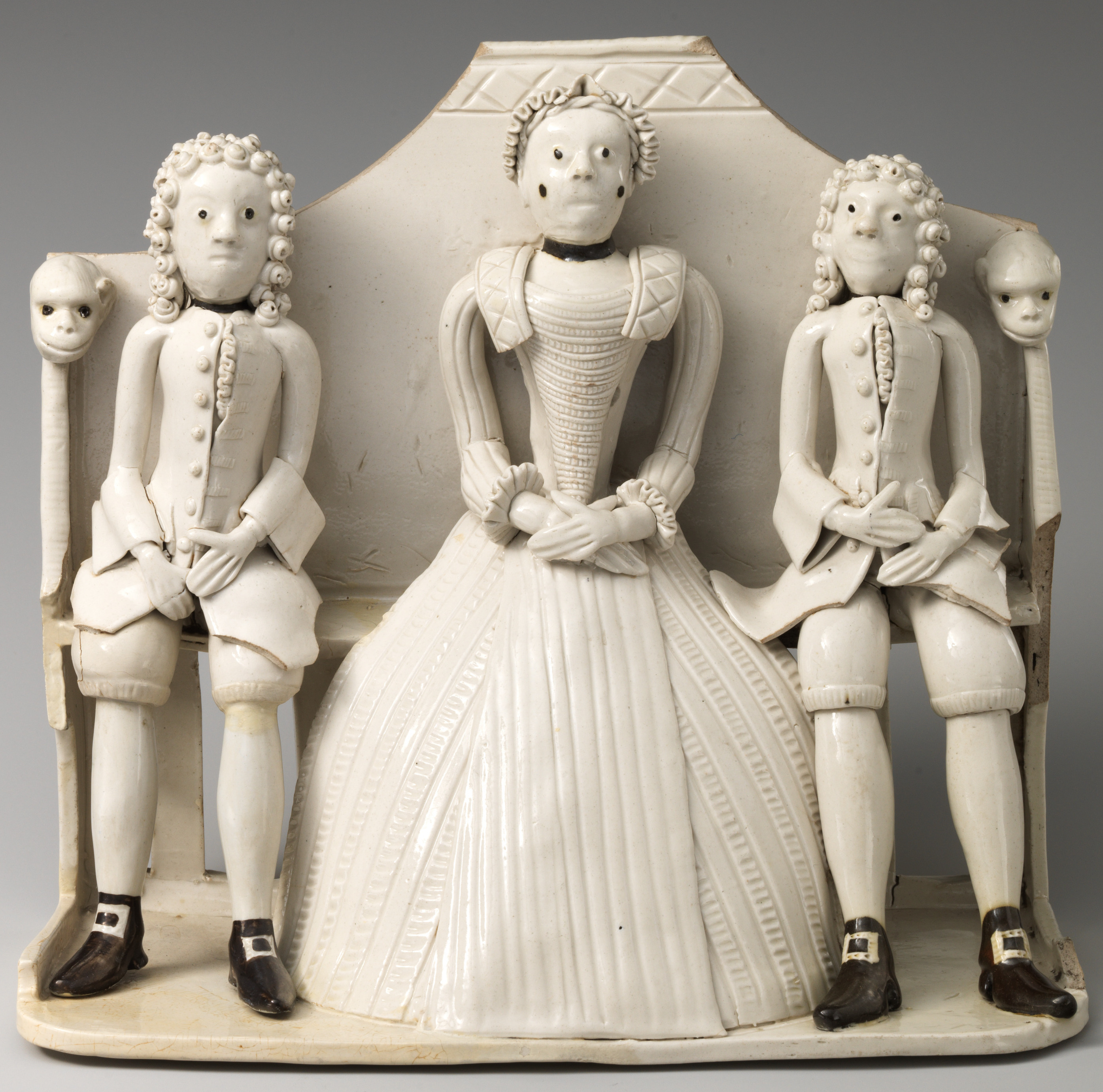
Pew group with monkey heads on bench, c. 1745, Staffordshire, salt-glazed stoneware. 7 1/2 × 8 3/8 in. (19.1 × 21.3 cm)

The pew group is a rare type of pottery Staffordshire figure, apparently made only in the 1740s. Typically it has two or three "rigidly posed" figures sitting on a high-backed bench, often with a woman in the centre; great attention is paid to details of hair and clothing. The setting is not church, as the usual name suggests, but a comfortable home or inn, where high-backed settles (protecting from draughts) were a common piece of furniture. Details are picked out in dark brown or black glaze, and dogs and musical instruments may be depicted, or the gentlemen may be taking snuff.

The two most elaborate group subjects in Staffordshire figures were the "arbour group", with two lovers seated in front of a bocage of foliage, and the pew group. The arbour group is a simplification of porcelain groups, whereas the pew group is more original to Staffordshire. Both types are "flatbacks", plain at the rear, as they were designed to be placed against a wall. The figures in arbour groups were already mostly moulded, but the pew groups were shaped and constructed individually, from rolled and moulded pieces of clays, with much use of "slabs" rolled flat. Despite the sculptural quality given by the contrast of thin sheets and round forms, this technique was not used for later figures.

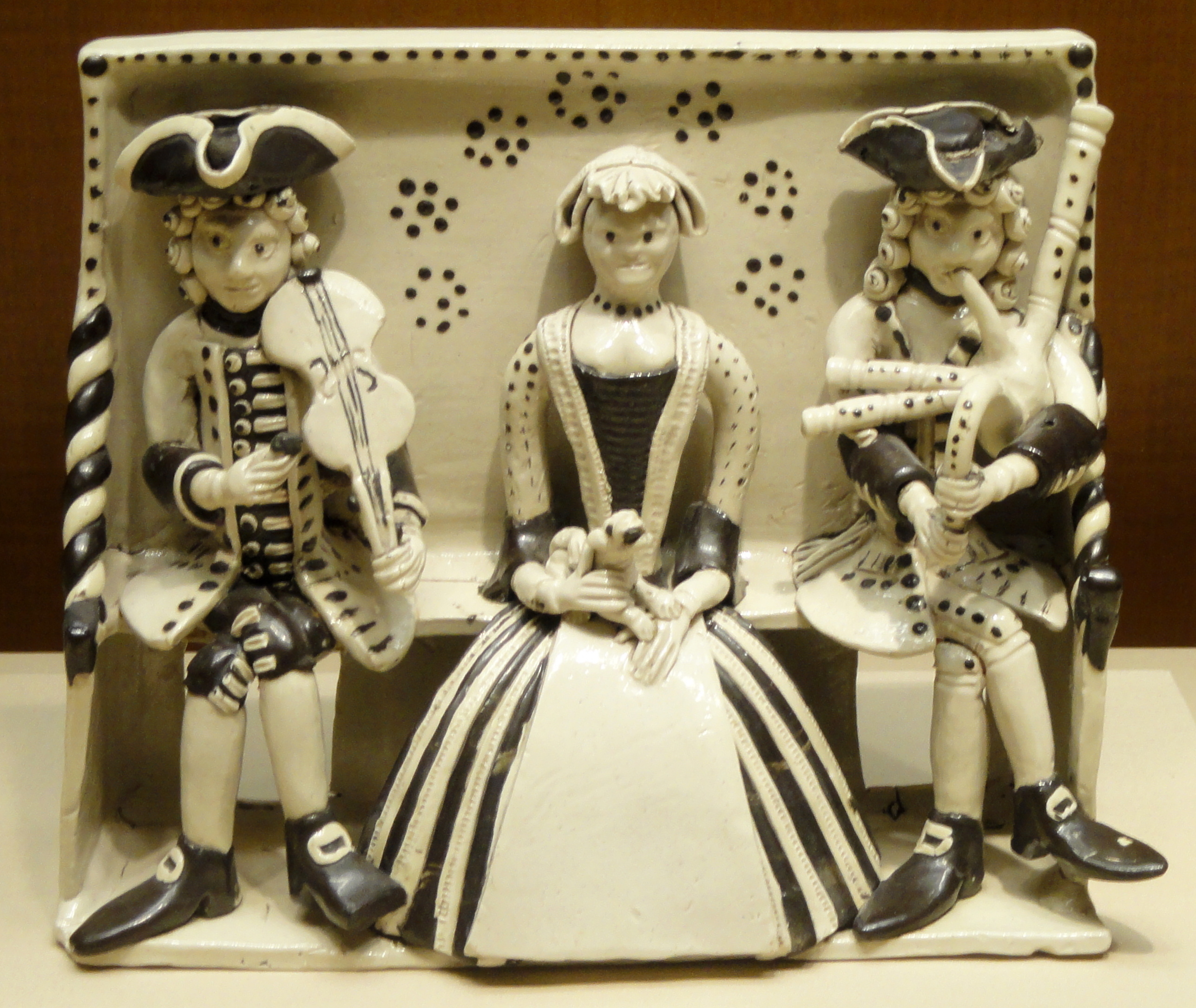
Lady with lapdog and two musicians, 1740s

It seems likely that they were made as individual commissions by potteries mostly making more routine wares, although almost none are inscribed with names, either of makers or patrons (see below for exception). It is possible the figures were intended as portraits of individuals. Their dating relies as much as anything on the style of the costumes, which are at the least genteel.

Pew groups are rare, and now extremely expensive. A pew group of c. 1745 sold for $168,000 at a Christie's auction in 2006, and in 1986 Sotheby's sold one for $179,520. There are also modern forgeries and imitations; some imitators have acquired their own collectors. An even more rare group, intermediate with the arbours, but sharing the pew group technique, was Adam and Eve standing with a very small tree (and snake) between them, and a bench rather oddly placed behind them.

== Construction ==
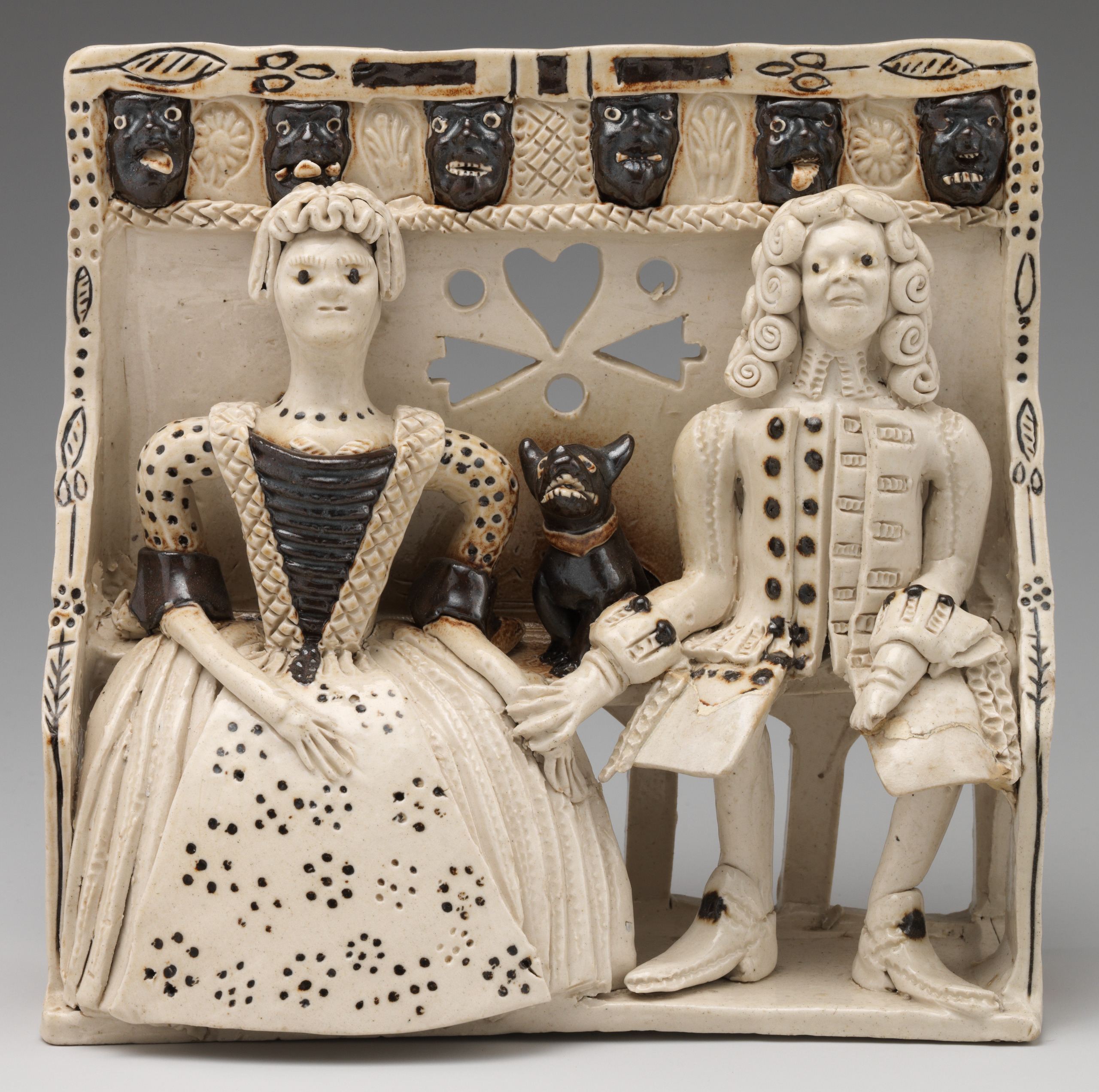
Couple with a pug dog, c. 1745. 5 1/2 × 5 3/4 in., 2 lb. (14 × 14.6 cm, 0.9 kg)

The settle framework is made from pieces rolled flat; the centre of the back may be decorated, either by piercing or incisions, which may be filled with brown slip. The arms and men's legs are rolled cylinders; the ladies have no legs underneath their wide skirts. For the clothes, thin cut slabs were fixed to a cylinder torso, with the many extra details made using a variety of techniques including stamps and roulettes (patterned roller wheels). Some of the dark details use slip painted on, but others such as shoes and cuffs were modelled in dark clay and attached.

== History ==
The groups are usually in salt-glazed stoneware, of a Staffordshire type newly developed in the 1730s by John Astbury, which was mostly used for tablewares. This is unlike the single but smaller Staffordshire figures, which are usually in glazed earthenware, which may be agateware, mixing white and brown clay immediately before shaping to give a marbled effect.

The groups were probably "made by a mere handful of potters"; they have been associated with the well-known potters Thomas Astbury and Aaron Wood, but on little evidence. A group that are lead-glazed and have circular benches with purple and brown highlights are impressed underneath with "Wedgwood", but this is not for Josiah Wedgwood but one of his many potter relatives.

The Fitzwilliam Museum in Cambridge has six examples from the collection of the Cambridge mathematician James Whitbread Lee Glaisher (1848–1928), including two Adam and Eve groups, one probably fake, plus another example bequeathed from another collection. All show just two figures. Glaisher also once owned the "monkey-head" group shown here.

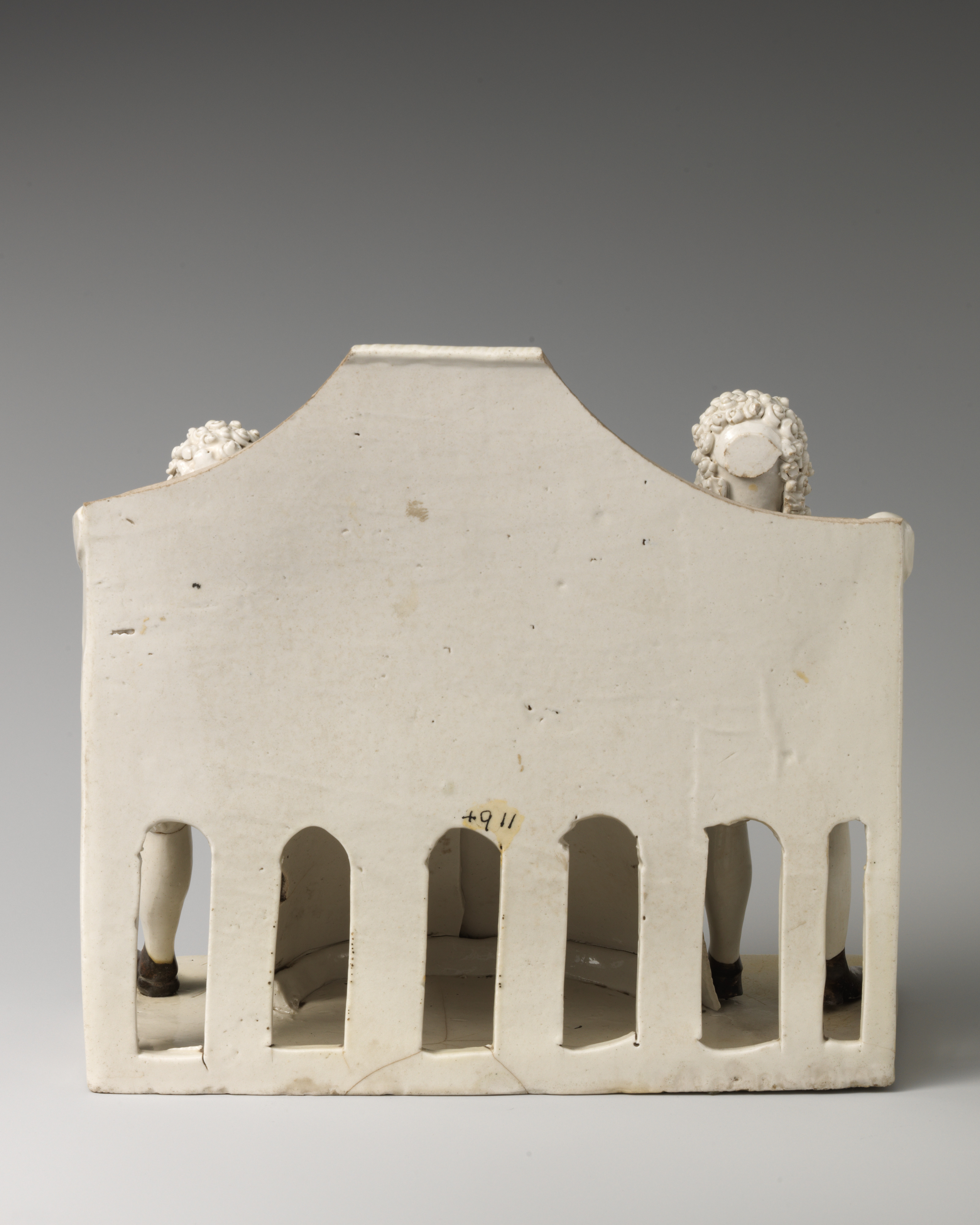
Back of the "monkey head" group at article top

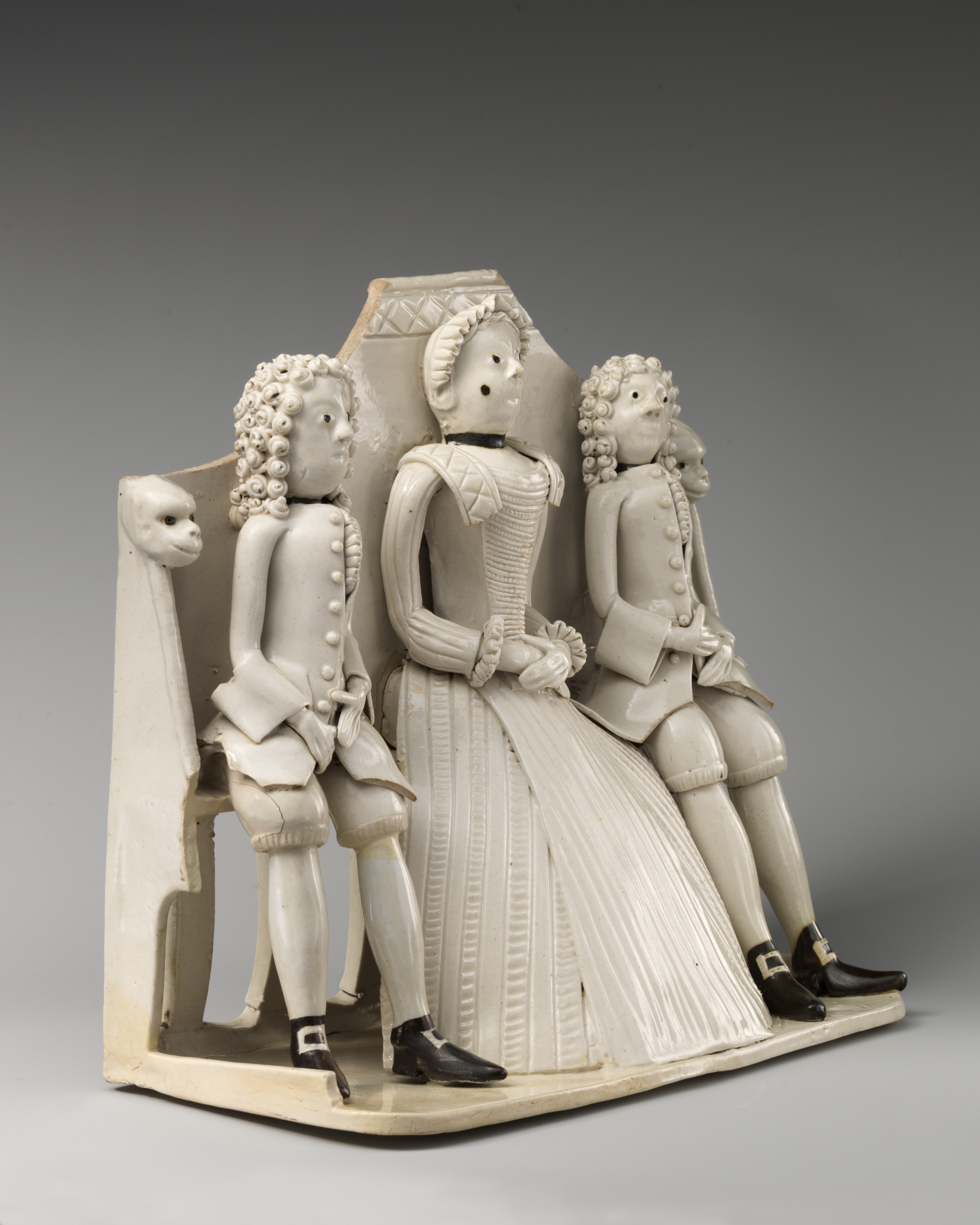
Side view

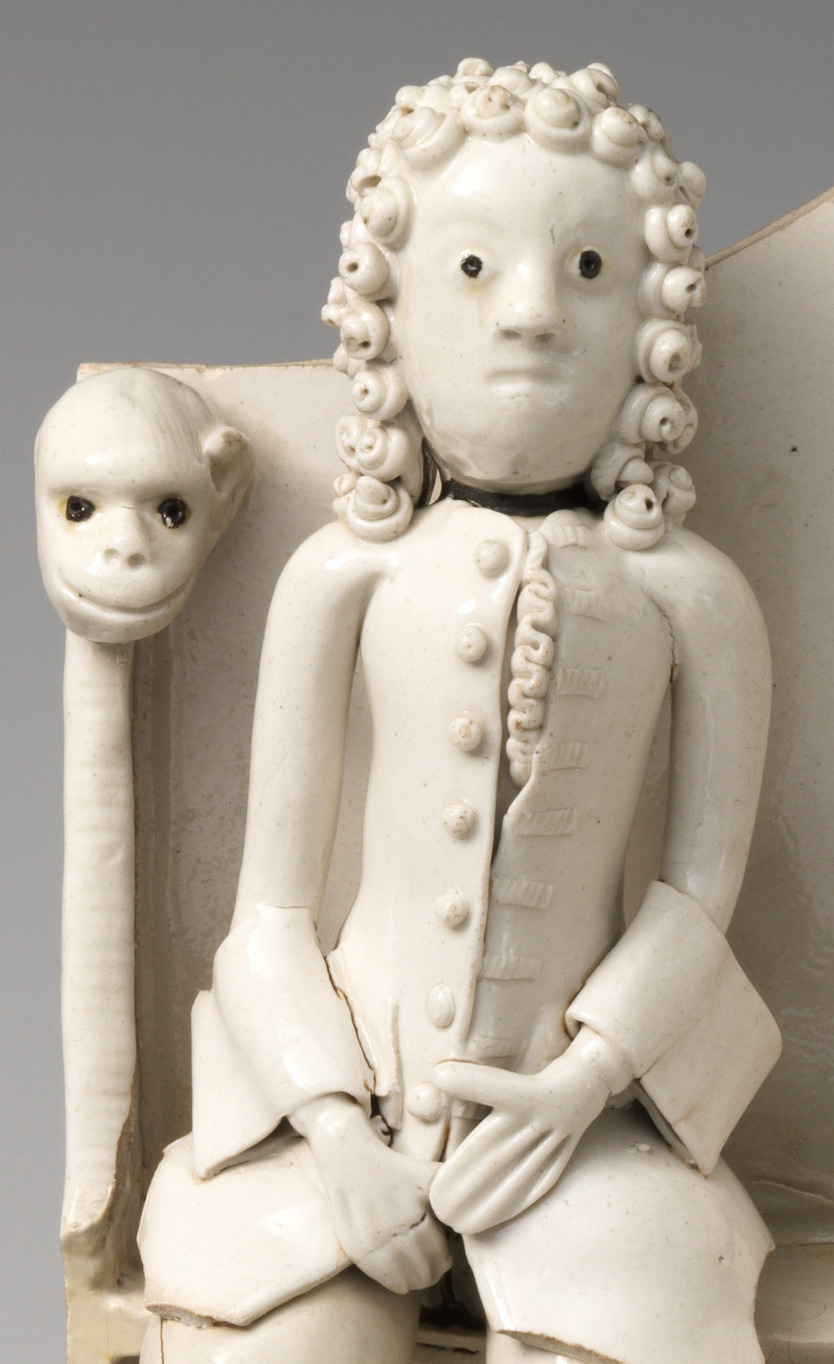
Detail of the man on the left

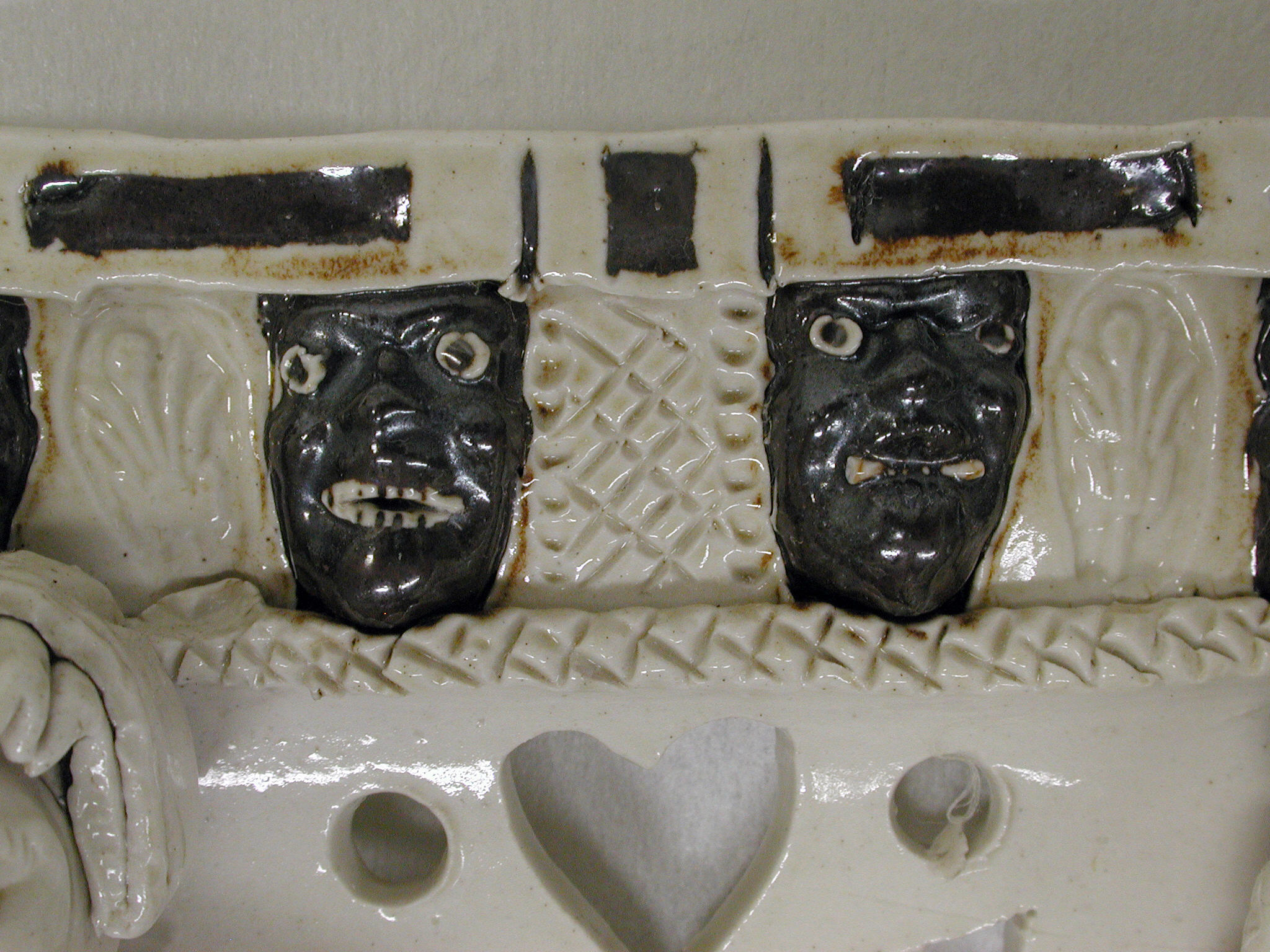
Detail of the masks on the settle, group above

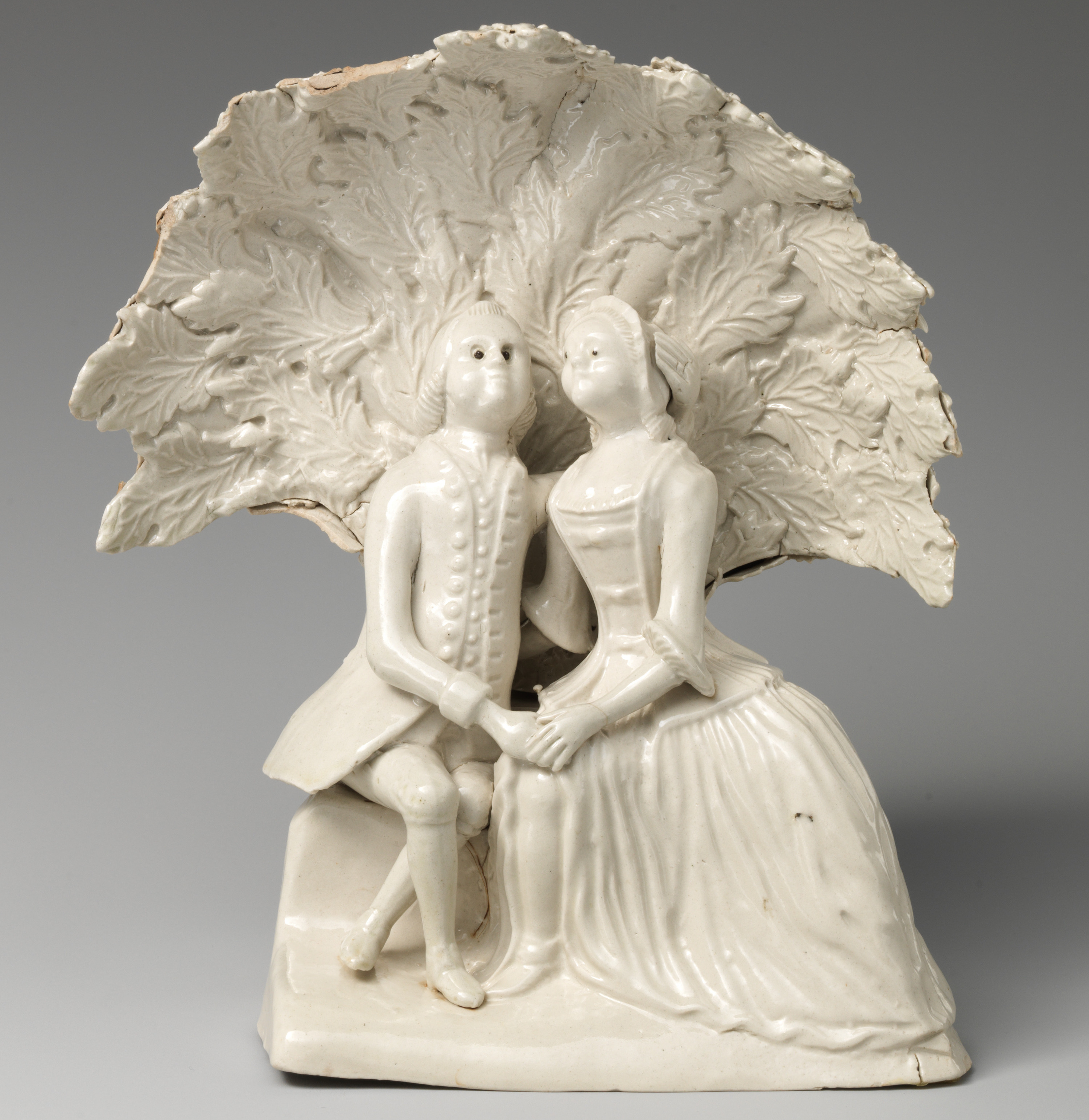
An early arbour group, c. 1750; only the eyes are coloured. The bocage behind is built up from moulded sections, and the torsos are moulded.
