= Folklife and Ethnological Museum of Macedonia and Thrace =

Museum in Thessaloniki, Greece

Coordinates: 40°36′36.65″N 22°57′8.55″E

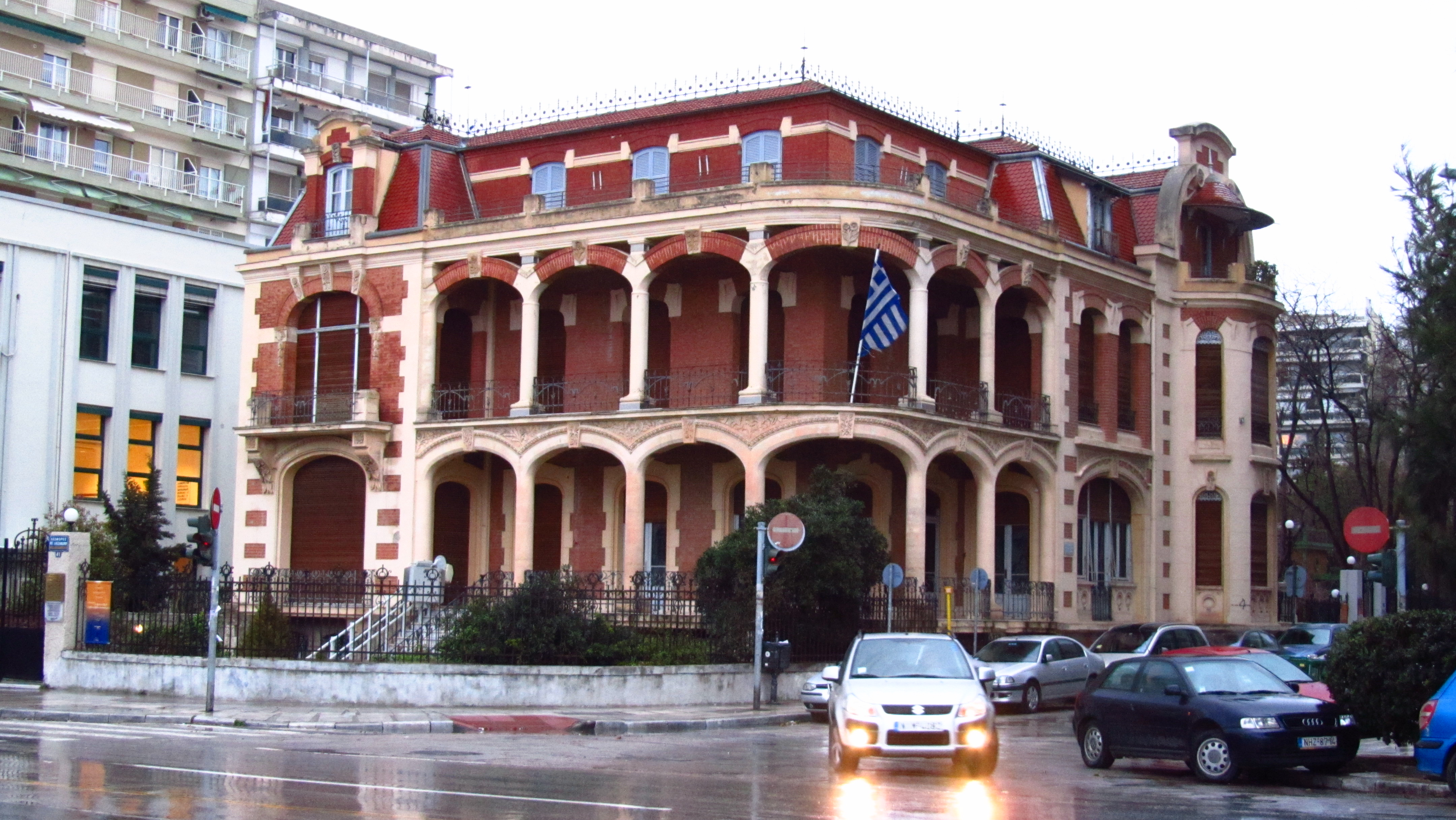
Villa Modiano

The Folk Life and Ethnological Museum of Macedonia and Thrace is located in Thessaloniki, Central Macedonia, Greece. It was founded in 1973 by the Macedonian Educational Association and is housed in the building known as Old Government House or Villa Modiano, which was built in 1906 by the architect Eli Modiano, on a 5 hectare plot of land by the sea, for the banker Jacob Modiano. The museum is on four levels, with a semi-basement, two floors, and an attic. Architecturally it is an eclectic structure strongly influenced by Art Nouveau. Particularly impressive is the double loggia with a view of the sea.

The museum collects, researches, and studies the remnants of traditional culture in Macedonia and Thrace and presents them to the public in temporary exhibitions. The museum's collections consist of some 15,000 objects (woven textiles, embroidery, local costumes, tools, weapons, domestic articles, musical instruments and woodcarving, woodworking and metalworking equipment). It also has a specialized library, a photographic archive, a record library and a sound library.

== Exhibitions ==
The permanent exhibitions of FEMM-Th focuses on basic needs of human society of food, shelter and clothing. Today two permanent exhibitions are displayed at the Museum.

The first of these exhibitions, 'At the Watermills of Macedonia and Thrace: Gristmills, Sawmills, Fulling Mills, Cloth-finishing Waterfalls in Traditional Society', which serves as an introduction to the next three thematic units, is regarding the pre-industrial technology and the exploitation of water as source of energy for the grinding of grain, the ripping of logs and the pounding of woolen clothes. This exhibition links and heralds the exhibitions to follow.

The second permanent exhibition 'Macedonia-Thrace: Traditional Costumes, 1860-1960', which has been inaugurated in 2005, includes 55 costumes from Macedonia and Thrace as well as from the historically confirmed extensions of Greece's northerly territories (Northern Macedonia, Eastern Thrace, Eastern Ru-melia, the Black Sea littoral and Asia Minor) that were inhabited by cohesive substantial communities conscious of their Greek origin.

== Sources ==
- This article incorporates text from the corresponding article at the Museums of Macedonia website, commissioned by the Macedonian Heritage foundation, written by Vlasis Vlasidis, and published under a CC-BY-SA-3.0 license.
