= George Smart =

George Smart may refer to:

- George Thomas Smart (1776–1867), English musician
- George Smart (footballer) (1890–1941), English footballer
- George Smart (tailor) (1774–1846), English tailor and artist
- George Smart (inventor) (died 1834), British inventor of a device for cleaning chimneys
- George Smart (skater) (1856-1909), British Fen skater
