= Carolingian cross =

Symbol that mixes Christian and pre-Christian concepts

Carolingian Cross of Fulda
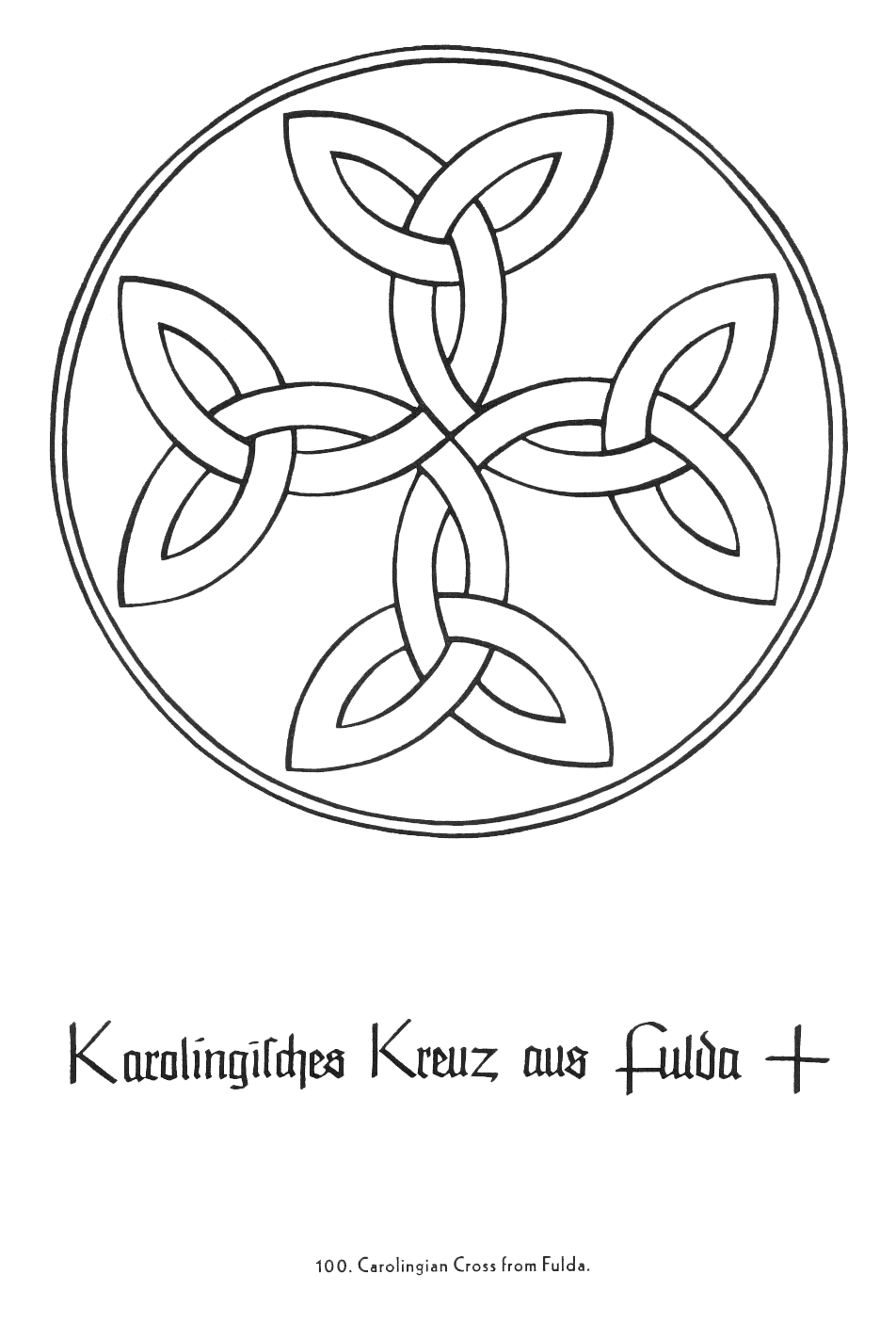
- Rudolph Koch 1932

Information
- Family: Carolingian
- Region: France

The Carolingian Cross is but one variation in the vast historical imagery of Christian symbolic representations of the Crucifixion of Jesus, going back to at least the ninth century. All crosses and Christian symbols have an inherent meaning arising from a multitude of sources and distinct features that set them apart from other religions. From both a design aspect and a theological perspective, the Carolingian Cross consists of a mixture of Christian and pre-Christian concepts built over a long history of cultural adaptation, religious iconography, liturgical practices and theological premises. German graphic designer Rudolf Koch in 1932 published a collection of 158 plates of drawings of Christian symbols. Under the heading of "Cross", this includes twelve drawings of Christian cross variants. One of these, the "Carolingian Cross" (Karolingisches Kreuz) shows a cross of four triquetras.

== Artistic inception ==
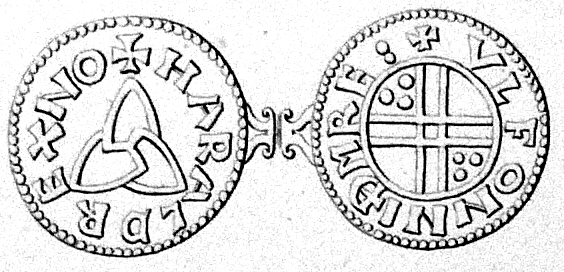
A Scandinavian coin with a cross and triquetra symbol

What differentiates the Carolingian Cross from other symbolic cross representations is that its design consists of four triquetrae rotated to form a cross symbol. The use of the triquetra to form the symbol of the cross is both a representation of Christian theological conceptions of the Holy Trinity inter-fused with pre-Christian or pagan ideas of the tree of life. The most famous of the pagan 'trees of life' was Yggdrasil, which stood as the centre of the world between heaven and earth. Yggdrasil for the Scandinavian people's brought both inspiration and knowledge to all those who believed in it, and would be a prime motivating symbol for the connection between Christ and the religious transformation of the pagans. In this way the Carolingian Cross serves two conceptual purposes. Within Christianity, the triquetra symbol is an abstract variation of the cross itself symbolising the Holy Trinity, and the image of the cross as a symbolic representation of Christ's sacrifice. External to Christianity, the triquetra symbol is found not only in ancient Celtic systems of religious thought, but also within that of the Scandinavian Vikings, and many other Germanic tribes within the Frankish region. The varied historical use of the triquetra has been used in Scandinavian runestone carvings, Scandinavian, Germanic and Roman coins, and found within Christian illuminated manuscripts and Celtic knot style artworks. Thus, the Carolingian cross represents an inter-mixing or interfusion of Christian and pre-Christian cultural beliefs within one representative symbol.

== Iconographic conceptions and the reception of the Carolingian Cross ==
Iconography is part and parcel of all major world religions, though none represent medieval Christianity more so than the sign of the cross. What designates this specific version of the Christian cross as distinctively Carolingian is its attachment to the Frankish royal family descended from Charles Martel, the role that Frankish clerics played in their theological conception or interpretation of the cross, and the dissemination of Christianity across the bourgeoning Frankish Empire.

=== Conception ===
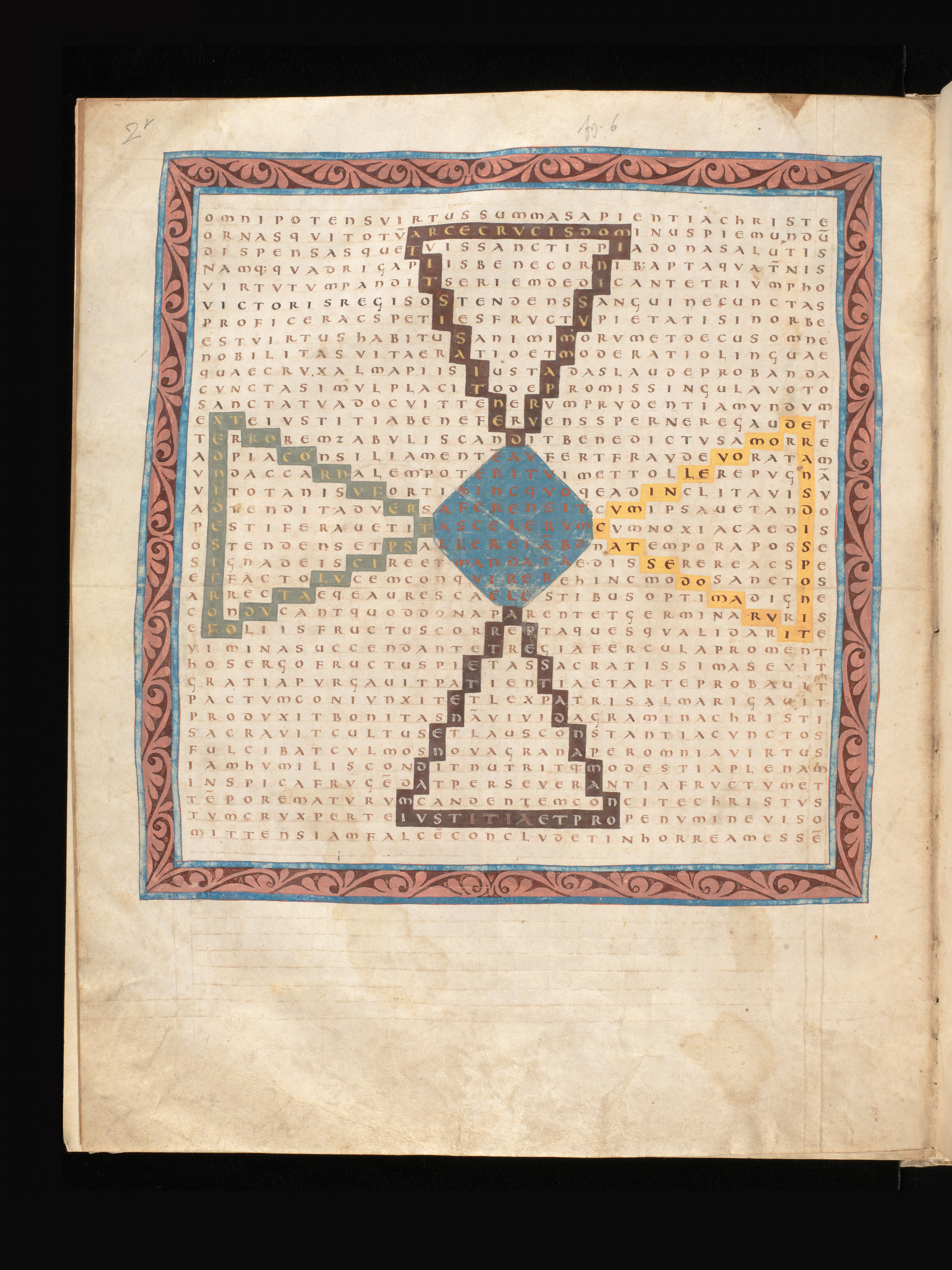
Hrabanus Maurus, cross conception, 'Liber de laudibus Sanctae Crucis', Bern, Burgerbibliothek, Cod. 9.

The Carolingian Cross is one of the lesser known cross variants, though its conception within the Christian religion can be dated as early as 813–814 anno domini within the manuscript work of Hrabanus Maurus' ‘In honorem sanctae crucis’ and 'Liber de laudibus Sanctae Crucis'. Hrabanus’ abstract conceptions, created at the Fulda Monastery, of the cross would be pivotal in aiding the Frankish clerical arguments that would be discussed at the Paris synod of 825, wherein it was decided by the Roman Clergy that an actual image of Christ (Christ hung upon the Cross) was still to be considered as blasphemy, though an abstract or metaphorical conception of the symbol of Christ's salvation and sacrifice was not. The Papacy allowed for all conceptions or figural representations of symbolic cross manufacture to be appropriate symbols of piety as long as the image of Christ was not apparent. The Carolingian Cross was created to not merely represent a visual effigy to maintain piety, as the mere sight of the cross was meant to inspire, but designed to also recreate the metaphor inherent in the Catholic faith of the “multi-temporality” that Christ represents to all Catholic Christians.

=== Reception ===
The Carolingian Cross represents not only Christ's crucifixion, but also represents the active presence of Christ's spirit and his prophetic second coming; past, present, and future, all bound or wound together. Professor Kitzinger, a world leading expert in Carolingian history notes that the cross for the Carolingians “alluded to fundamental issues about the power of representation and material presence that extend beyond cross-objects and cross-images themselves”. The Opus Caroli Regis further pushed the idea that ideational cross objects, in both manuscript and physical form already held the sanctity of god and further promoted the creation of differing cross concepts. However, the symbol of the cross holds many various meanings to both Christians and non-Christians alike. It is a multi-faceted representative object of faith. Much of the history and the conceptions of this iconic symbol can be found within the theoretical artworks of many medieval manuscripts.

== Carolingian adaptations of Anglo-Saxon insular cross artwork ==
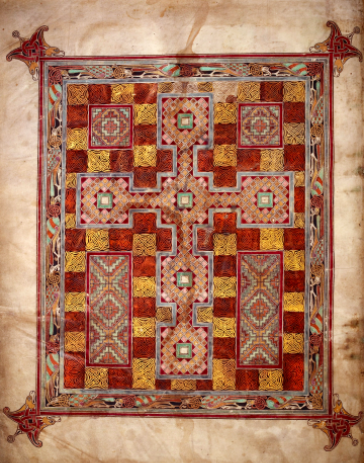
Lindisfarne Gospel Cotton MS Nero D IV fol.2v, c.700

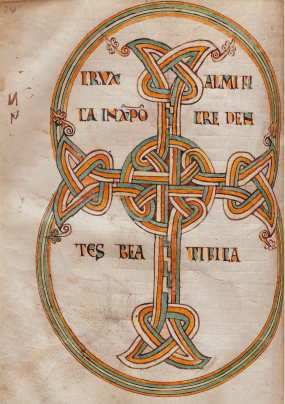
Essen Gospels, Lotharingia, 9th c. Cathedral Treasury, Hs. I, fols. 13v-14r

Artwork and the liturgical imagery of the Cross was pivotal for early medieval lay Christians to be able to connect with not only the conception of Christ's divine providence and his sacrifice for humanity, but to also serve a functional utility as a visual communicative reminder that Christ was actively present in the world through liturgical representation.

=== Anglo-Saxon artwork ===
The design of the Carolingian cross borrows heavily from the compositional style of insular art contained within the interlacing or knot work of the Anglo-Saxon Lindisfarne Gospels ‘carpet pages’. Sacred number theory was one of the most important features of Christian art throughout the Middle Ages, and one of the prime arguments against images and sculptures of the cross being seen as blasphemous idolatry. Augustine of Hippo created one of the first defences of Christian imagery by asserting that the universe operated according to ordered design, that numerical geometric representations constituted the core of divine providence. This was later backed up by Irish monks in their writings contained within the 628a.d. ‘Liber de ordine creaturarum’ (the book of the order of creation), and the dialogues contained within it, the computus (calculation). The Irish monks used the logic of Boethius’ ideas on universal geometry noting that: “everything that is fashioned from the first nature of things (a prima rerum natura), is perceived to be given form by the ratio of numbers”, for this was the principal exemplar in the creator's mind. From this is derived the multiplicity of the four elements, the changes of the seasons, and the understanding of the cycle of the motion of the stars and the heavens. This idea of the four elements ties in well with the Carolingian cross imagery: the four elements = the four cross points; which in turn comes to symbolically represent the four ideas of divine providence; the father (God), the son (Christ), the holy spirit, and the divine order or unity of the cosmos, as is seen in the Essen Gospels. Gospel manuscripts were a vital component to the Christianisation of Frankish medieval Europe, as most non-Christian societies of the time had sparse written records of their religious beliefs and were generally illiterate in Latin. The visual imagery and spoken poetry of gospels aided in the spread of the cross being understood by all lay people and non-Christians alike as the ultimate representation of Christ.

=== Adaptations ===
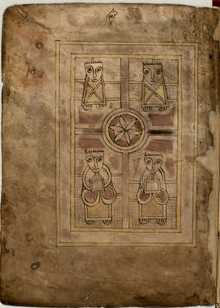
Book of Deer, Ms Ii.6.32, fol.85v

The writing of gospel books was one of the most important means for conceptualising and transmitting the Christian idea of the Cross to newly Christianised people and non-believers alike, and in almost every manuscript written in the Carolingian period, even the words were written in acrostic forms, as can be seen in the work of Hrabanus Maurus. In this way, the cross for the Carolingians was not only a representation of Christ, but a continuity between the symbol and the written word. The Insular tradition of using knot work and pictures of interlaced crosses, as seen in the Lindisfarne Gospels and the Book of Deer, was not only to confirm or validate for Christians that their belief was based upon a universal precept of divine unity, but that when shown to pagans it would connect and reflect their own religious beliefs within the Christian outlook. It is in this way that art aided the spread of Christianity throughout the expanding Carolingian kingdom.

== Imperialism and the appropriation of pagan culture ==
For the Carolingians, the Christian religion was the means by which the Frankish kingdoms were to be united; faith and worship in Christ and allegiance to the Carolingian emperor. Christian missionaries were sent out across the lands to convert as many people as they could, ever with the cross in hand. Carolingian clerics would utilise theological storytelling to integrate pagan non-believers into the Christian religion by showing the pagans that through Christ they could enter into a shared historical community by asserting that the pagans' religion and many of their traditions confirmed Christianity's unifying precepts. The idea of the cross being a symbol of Christ and as an active effigy in the ritual of Christian worship worked in favour of the Christian missionary role of converting non-believers to Christianity.

=== Pagan cultural immersion ===
One of the main problems with any kind of historical inquiry into pagan ritual, lifestyle, and beliefs systems of this time is that they are predominantly told from the Christian clerical perspective. What was written by clerics and scribes as ‘pagan’ belief in those times is incredibly hard to discern, especially from an ethnic outlook, as most of the people who populated much of the Franco-Germanic region had vastly different systems of belief even within Christianity. And even as Roman classicism flourished in the Carolingian manuscript annals, pagan mysticism also became part of the overarching narrative within Christian thought. Much of what was going on during this time was an ‘enculturation’ of ideas; a cross-blending of faiths, where many of the “pagans” infused elements of Christianity into their own belief system and vice versa. One of the main reasons for why the Carolingian cross looks the way it does stems from many facets of cultural misunderstanding, not only on the part of pagan converts to the Christian faith, but also because Carolingian allegorical writers were using the historical work of Virgil and others to re-interpret Germanic pagan belief systems. Interpretation was a major focal point of Christian mythology and pagan stories like Virgil's epic of the Trojan war were integrated into the Christian narrative to give a more formative and extensive history of Christianity. By absorbing antiquated Greek and Roman beliefs and poems within their own historical narrative, Carolingian Christian scholars were able to create a historical world that extended further back in time then their non-believing counterparts. Pagan mysticism became amalgamated though a Christian lens; mythology became theology, mythological heroes and gods were renamed as deified rulers, and the history of the pre-Christian world was brought into line with the idea of Christ's salvation.

=== Imperial Expansion and the rising spread of Frankish Christianity ===
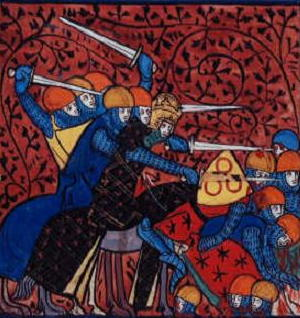
Charlemagne depicted battling the Saxons. From Chroniques de France. Charlemagne as a warrior king

To unite the region under one ruler, the Carolingians set out on a program of expanding their empire in imitation of the Roman conquerors that had come over a millennium before them. The use of secular imagery and imperial vocabulary within Christianity goes all the way back to Justinian II, and the Carolingians set out to fuse together many aspects of not only imperial Roman history into the Christian narrative, but also that of pagan religious thought to promote their validity as divine monarchs. The right of divine rule was a long-held belief not only in the Christian Frankish kingdoms, but also in the Anglo-Saxon isles and the Scandinavian Viking Regions. Tyr the Swedish god of war, Mars the Roman god of war, and Odin the Norwegian warrior king were used as prime exemplars to subvert and change pagan religious narratives into Christianised ones. Charlemagne would be the first Carolingian ruler to put this sentiment to good use and asserted his claim as the divine Christian ruler of the whole Frankish realm and north-western Germanic regions. In this way Charlemagne and the Carolingian missionaries used pagan beliefs to convert pagan rulers to Christianity by turning their own supernatural conceptions of warrior gods into Christian ones. As warrior kings were well respected amongst pagan Norse rulers, Charlemagne fashioned not only himself, but also the image of Christ as a warrior king, shown in the Miles Christi image; 9th c. Bibliothèque Nationale, Paris. MS Lat.8318, fol 55r. Divine providence was one of the most important components in winning over pagans to the Christian side, and every battle that Charlemagne won confirmed for some of the pagan rulers that by converting to Christianity these rulers could achieve their own fame and glory.
