= Triquetra =

Triangular motif formed of three interlaced arcs or loops

Interlaced triquetra which is a trefoil knot

The triquetra (/traɪˈkwɛtrə/ try-KWEH-truh; from the Latin adjective triquetrus "three-cornered") is a triangular figure composed of three interlaced arcs, or (equivalently) three overlapping vesicae piscis lens shapes. It is used as an ornamental design in architecture, and in medieval manuscript illumination (particularly in the Insular tradition). Its depiction as interlaced is common in Insular ornaments from about the 7th century. In this interpretation, the triquetra represents the topologically simplest possible knot.

Comparison of associated Reuleaux triangle (red hatching), triquetra (blue) and vesica piscis (teal)

== History ==
=== Iron Age ===
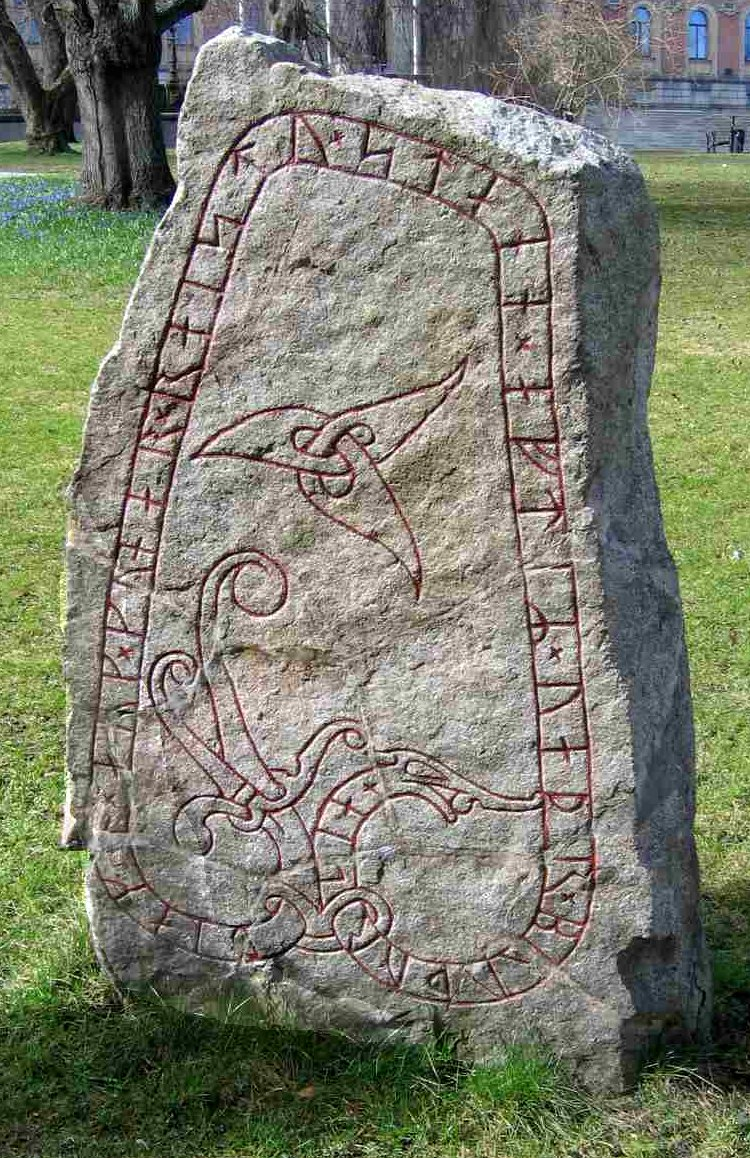
Triquetra on one of the Funbo Runestones (11th century), located in the park of Uppsala University.

The term triquetra in archaeology is used of any figure consisting of three arcs, including a pinwheel design of the type of the triskeles. Such symbols become frequent from about the 4th century BC ornamented ceramics of Anatolia and Persia, and it appears on early Lycian coins.

The triquetra bears a resemblance to the valknut, a design of three interlacing triangles, found in the same context.

=== Insular art ===
The triquetra is often found in insular art, most notably metal work and in illuminated manuscripts like the Book of Kells. It is a "minor though recurring theme" in the secondary phase of Anglo-Saxon sceatta production (c. 710–760). It is found in similar artwork on early Christian High Crosses and slabs. An example from early medieval stonework is the Anglo-Saxon frithstool at Hexham Abbey.

The symbol has been interpreted as representing the Holy Trinity, especially since the Celtic revival of the 19th century. The original intention by the early medieval artists is unknown and should not be subject to over-interpretation. It is, however, regularly used as a Trinitarian symbol in contemporary Catholic iconography.

=== Buddhist tradition ===
The triquetra has been a known symbol in Japan called Musubi Mitsugashiwa. Being one of the forms of the Iakšaku dynasty signs, it reached Japan with the dynasty's Kāśyapīya spreading technology and Buddhism via the Kingdom of Khotan, China, and Korea.

== Modern use ==
The triquetra is often used artistically as a design element when Celtic knotwork is used, especially in association with the modern Celtic nations. The triquetra, also known as an "Irish Trinity Knot", is often found as a design element in popular Irish jewelry such as claddaghs and other wedding or engagement rings. Some Christians use the triquetra as a symbol for the Trinity. In the 19th century interest in archeology and medieval Celtic art led to the reuse of the Triquetra as a motif of the Celtic Revival. One of the earliest references to the triquetra as a Trinity symbol was by Dr. George Petrie in his 1845 book The Ecclesiastical Architecture of Ireland. Another leading scholar, J. Romilly Allen, expressed his doubts about Trinity symbolism in his 1905 book Early Christian Monuments of Scotland.

Celtic pagans or neopagans who are not of a Celtic cultural orientation may use the triquetra to symbolise a variety of concepts and mythological figures. Due to its presence in insular Celtic art, Celtic Reconstructionists use the triquetra either to represent one of the various triplicities in their cosmology and theology (such as the tripartite division of the world into the realms of Land, Sea, and Sky), or as a symbol of one of the specific Celtic triple goddesses – for example the battle goddess, The Morrígan. The symbol is also sometimes used by Wiccans, White Witches, and some New Agers to symbolise the Triple Goddess, or as a protective symbol.

== Popular Culture ==
In the 1998–2006 American fantasy drama Charmed, that ran on the now-defunct The WB network, the triquetra was prominently used as a symbol on the Halliwells' Book of Shadows, the book of spells, potions, and other information the sisters used to fight evil. The triquetra was also used as a symbol of the Charmed Ones and their collective Power of Three. The triquetra on the Book of Shadows would be seen to fracture and pull apart when their bond was temporarily broken by a demon. It was also featured prominently in the opening credits of each episode throughout its eight-season run. The symbol was also used in the 2018 reboot that ran on The CW.

In the TV series The Walking Dead (2010), Michonne's katana features a triquetra, chosen for its meaning as a "triple goddess symbol".

In the German Netflix series Dark (2017), it symbolizes the caves' closed time loops with each loop being 33 years apart, with the past affecting the future and the future influencing the past. The Triquetra is of significant symbolic value to the time travelers. This symbol can be seen on the Cave's metal door, on the Emerald Tablet, in The Stranger's papers, and in the Sic Mundus photo.

The Triquetra is shown on Thor's hammer, Mjölnir, in the 2011 film Thor. After Odin utters to Mjölnir the words "Whosoever holds this hammer, if he be worthy, shall possess the power of Thor", the Triquetra vanishes. It represents Asgard, Midgard, and Utgard.

The Triquetra is also used on the logo of the video game developer Treyarch, one of the developers of the Call of Duty franchise.

The Triquetra is also used as the symbol of "Mora", the common currency used in the world of "Genshin Impact".

== Gallery ==
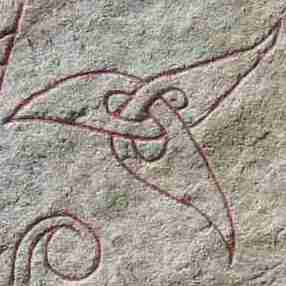
Close-up of a triquetra on one of the Funbo Runestones.

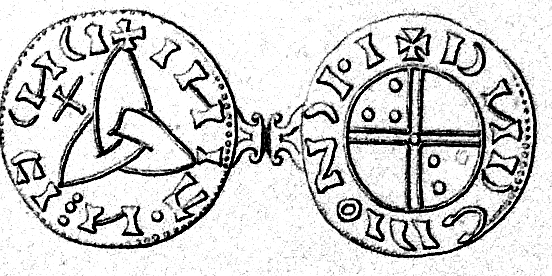
Interlaced triquetra on a Norwegian penny minted under Harald Hardrada (r. 1047-1066)

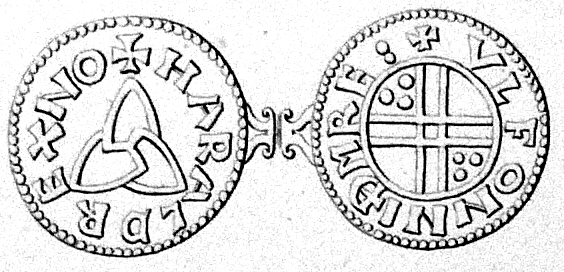
Norwegian penny minted under Harald Hardrada (r. 1047-1066)

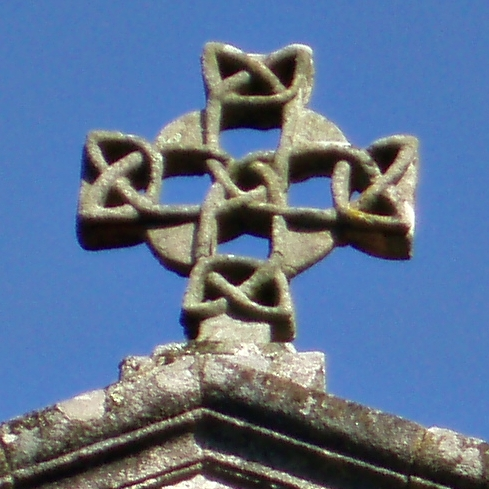
Four triquetras forming a "Carolingian cross" in the church of Santa Susanna in Galicia (11th/12th century[cite?]).

=== Variant forms ===
Triquetra composed exactly of three overlapping Vesica piscis symbols.

An interlaced double triquetra.

Tightly-knotted form of triquetra.

Triquetra interlaced with circle as Celtic symbol (a "Trinity knot"). (Later adopted by Christian iconography as representative of "the Trinity")

Triquetra in blue as part of an interlaced Celtic decorative symbol. (Later adopted by Christian iconography as representative of "the Trinity")

Interlaced triquetra in the style of the Funbo Runestone

The cross of triquetras, or "Carolingian cross".

Cross composed of four interlaced triquetras.

Celtic cross with triquetras.

== See also ==
- Borromean rings
- Cintamani
- Johnson circles
- Three hares
- Tomoe
- Triskelion
- Valknut
