= Funbo Runestones =

Runestones erected in Uppland, Sweden in the 11th century

The Funbo runestones constitute a group of four runestones originally from Funbo, now a district of Uppsala Municipality in the province of Uppland, Sweden. The runestones were raised by members of the same family during the eleventh century.

The following presentations show the runic script transliterated into Latin script, together with transcriptions into the Old West Norse and Old East Norse dialects of Old Norse and translations into English. The runestones are listed in order of their Rundata catalog listing, chronologically U 999 is the oldest inscription and is followed by U 990 and then the two stones U 937 and U 991.

== U 937 ==
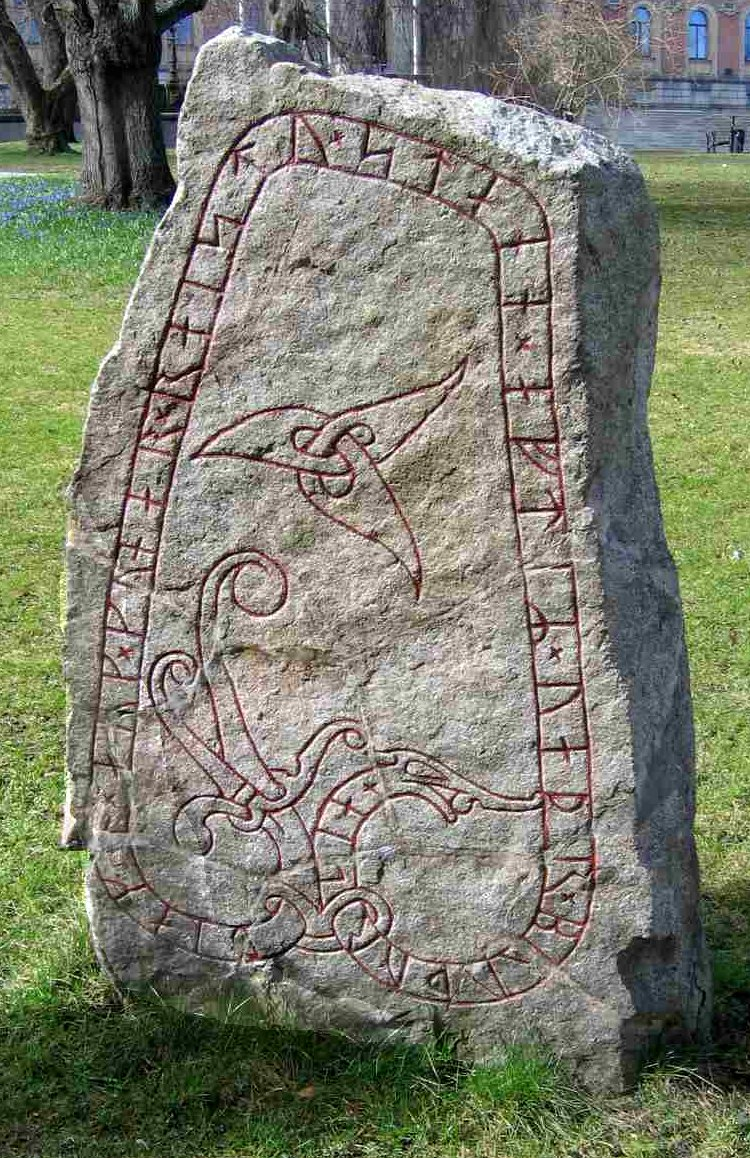
U 937 is currently in the park of Uppsala University and features a triquetra.

The runestone designated as U 937 in the Rundata catalog was found in Uppsala in 1875 in the walls of a Franciscan monastery between the streets of St. Persgatan and Klostergatan, and is currently located at a park in Uppsala University. The fact that its inscription mentions names from the same family as the runestones of Funbo, shows that it was formerly part of the same group. Like many other runestones, it had been used as construction material at a time when the historical significance of the stones was not understood. It is considered to be a good example of runestone style Pr3, which is also known as the Urnes style. This runestone style is characterized by slim and stylized animals that are interwoven into tight patterns. The animals heads are typically seen in profile with slender almond-shaped eyes and upwardly curled appendages on the noses and the necks. On this stone the runic text lies within a serpent that circles a triquetra, which would have been considered a high status motif.

Because the runic text of runestones U 937 and U 991 have the same message, it has been suggested that they were once at the same site and formed a coupled memorial to the deceased brother Veðr. They are considered to be the most recent of the four Funbo inscriptions and, although unsigned, are considered to be the work of the runemaster Fot. He is known for his Urnes style inscriptions and for the consistency of his use of the punctuation mark × between words, as shown in the runic text of this runestone.

× þiak(n) × auk × kunar × raistu × stana × aftiʀ × uaþr × bruþur sin ×
{} Þegn {} ok {} Gunnarr {} reistu {} steina {} eptir {} Veðr, {} bróður sinn. {}
{} Þiagn {} ok {} Gunnarr {} ræistu {} stæina {} æftiʀ {} Veðr, {} broður sinn. {}
Thane and Gunnar raised this stone after Veðr, their brother.

== U 990 ==
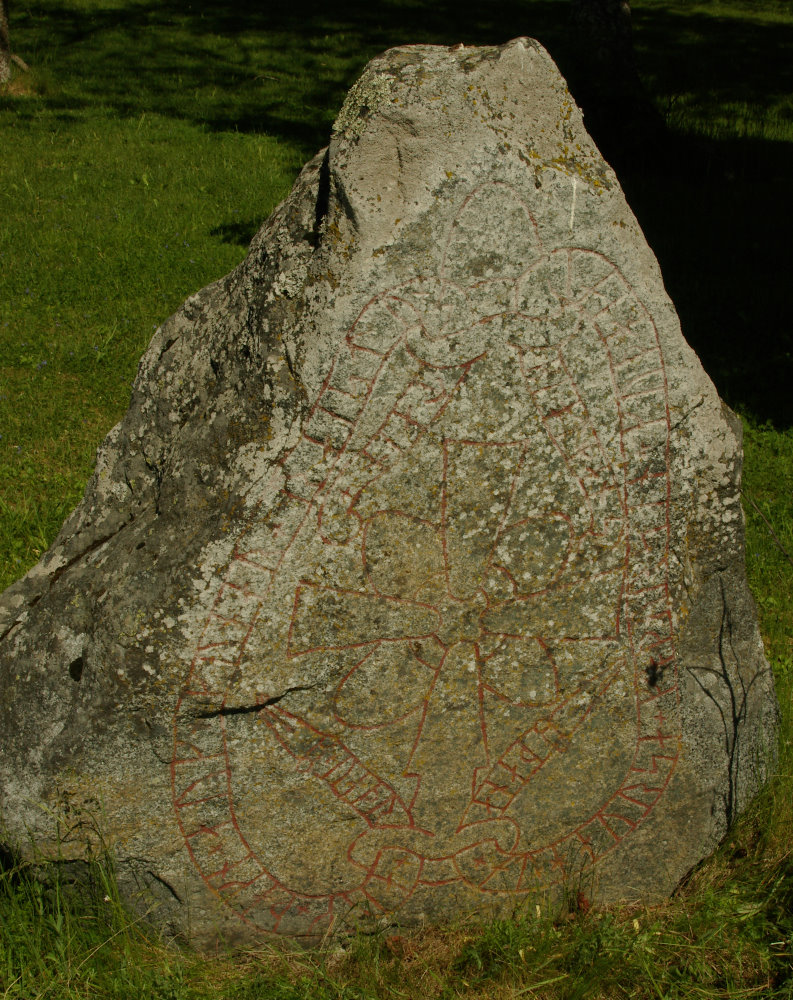
U 990 has a stylized cross.

Runestone U 990 has its runic text within a serpent that circles a central Christian cross. It remains in its original location in Funbo. It is composed of granite and is 1.5 meters in height. This stone is classified as being carved in runestone style Fp, which is characterized by runic bands that end with animal heads when seen from above.

uaþr + auk × þakn × auk × kunar + raistu × stain + þana × at × haursa × foþur sin + kuþ hialbi ot hans ×
Veðr {} ok {} Þegn {} ok {} Gunnarr {} reistu {} stein {} þenna {} at {} Haursa, {} fôður sinn. {} Guð hjalpi ônd hans. {}
Veðr {} ok {} Þegn {} ok {} Gunnarr {} ræistu {} stæin {} þenna {} at {} Haursa, {} faður sinn. {} Guð hialpi and hans. {}
Veðr and Thane and Gunnar raised this stone after Haursi, their father. God help his soul.

== U 991 ==
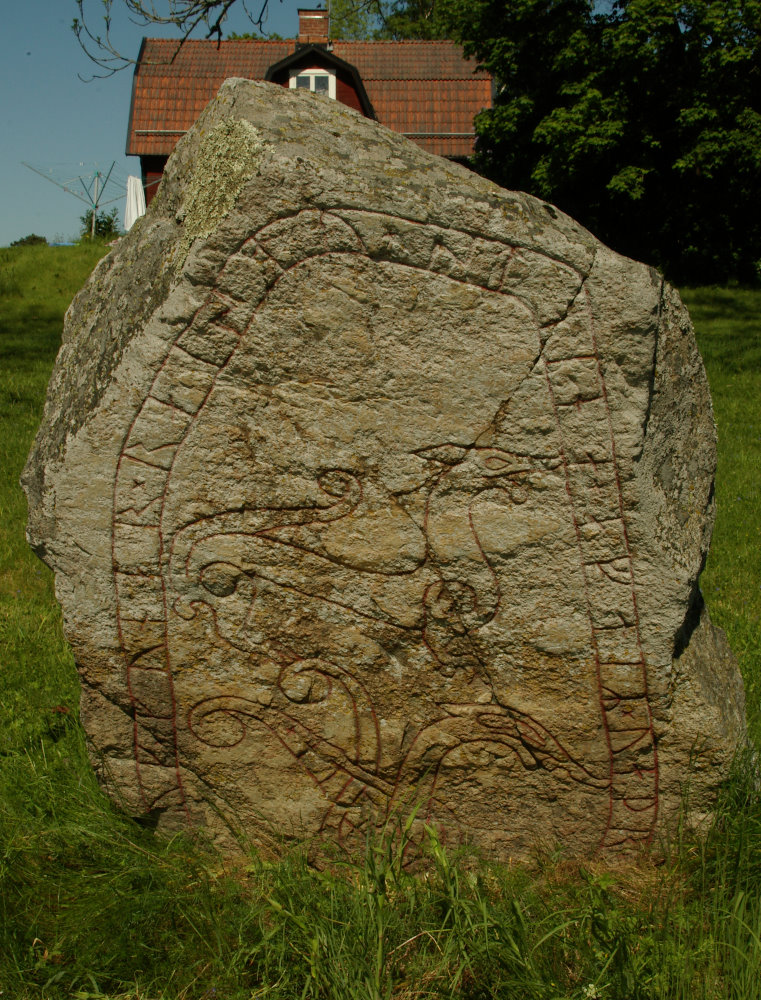
U 991 has the same runic text as U 937.

Runestone U 991, which is composed of granite and is 1.5 meters in height, consists of runic text within a serpent that circles a central beast. Although having different imagery, it contains the same message in its inscription as U 937. Because they have the same message, it has been suggested that they once formed part of a coupled memorial at the same site to the deceased brother Veðr. These are considered to be the most recent of the four Funbo inscriptions and, although unsigned, are attributed to the runemaster Fot. U 991 is classified as being carved in either runestone style Pr3 or Pr4.

== U 999 ==
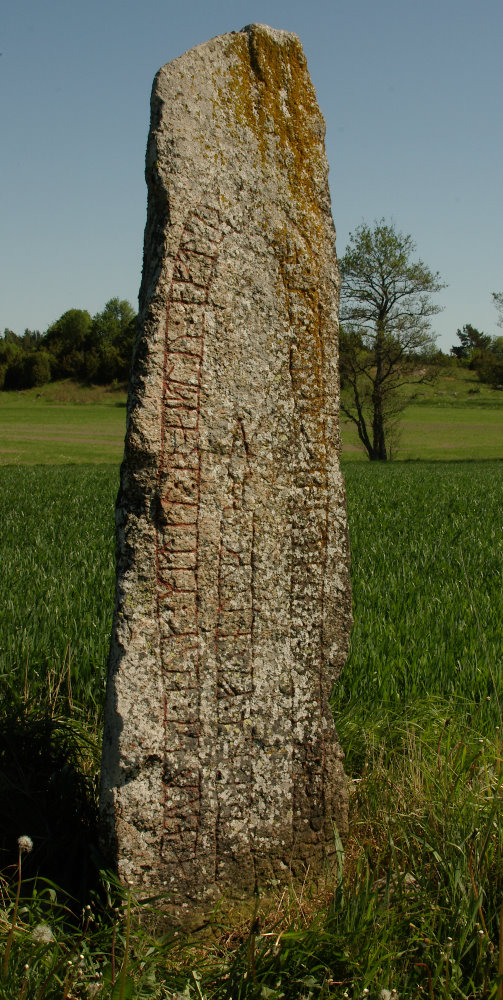
U 999 is the oldest of the four stones.

Runestone U 999 has text within a band that ends in a serpent head and was raised by Haursi and his brother after their father. This granite stone is 1.65 meters in height and is considered to have the oldest inscription of the four runestones from Funbo. It is classified as being carved in runestone style Fp.

haursi : auk : kitil : raistu : aftir : þekn : faþur : sin : staina : þisa : at : bunta : kuþan : o : funum
Haursi {} ok {} Ketill {} reistu {} eptir {} Þegn, {} fôður {} sinn, {} steina {} þessa, {} at {} bónda {} góðan {} á {} Funnum/Fúnum.
Haursi {} ok {} Kætill {} ræistu {} æftiʀ {} Þegn, {} faður {} sinn, {} stæina {} þessa, {} at {} bonda {} goðan {} a {} Funnum/Funum.
Haursi and Ketill raised these stones in memory of Thegn, their father; in memory of the good husbandman of Funnir/Fúnir.

== See also ==
- List of runestones
