= Concepts in folk art =

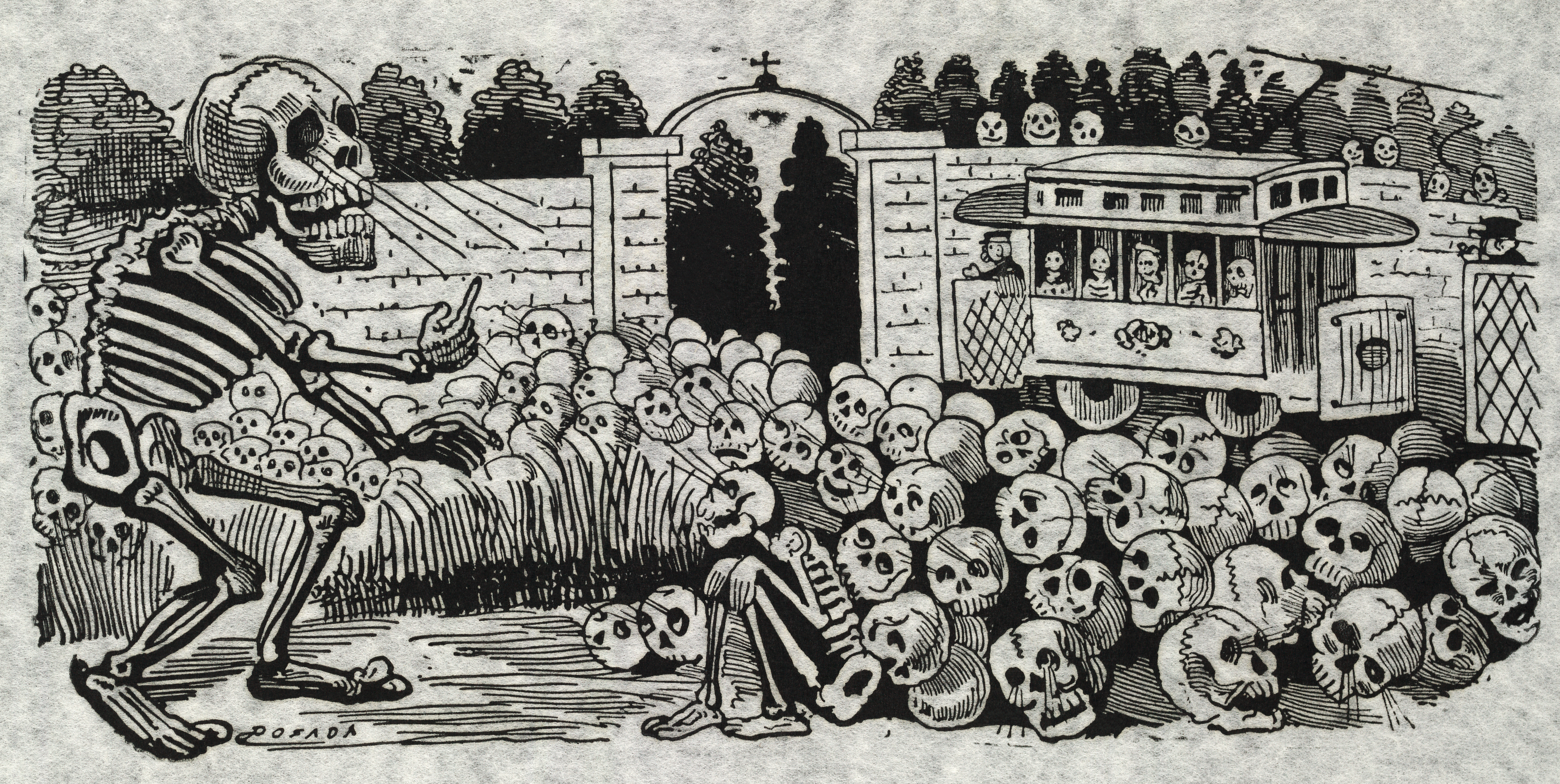
"Gran calavera eléctrica" by José Guadalupe Posada, Mexico, 1900–1913

Folk and traditional arts are rooted in and reflective of the cultural life of a community. They encompass the body of expressive culture associated with the fields of folklore and cultural heritage. Tangible folk art includes historic objects which are crafted and used within a traditional community. Intangible folk arts include forms such as music, dance and narrative structures. Tangible and intangible folk arts were developed to address a need, and are shaped by generational values derived from family and community, through demonstration, conversation and practice.

Tangible and intangible artefacts are used by historians to understand the significance of cultural forms in the historical community. This is done through studying their creation, transmission and performance which display the community's values and structure.

== Terminology ==
The combination of "folk" and "art" have been discussed extensively in literature to articulate meaning and delineate from other art genres.

=== Defining ‘Folk’ ===
The social identity of 'folk' emerged in the late 19th century in rural populaces that were subject to greater poverty and lower literacy rates. This social identity eventually broadened to represent the underclass of modern society due to the rise in popularity of Marxist theory in the academic world, which began to identify both the rural and urban poor as allied subjects of economic inequality.

In the 20th century the growth of the social sciences contributed to an expanded definition of 'folk'. By the 1960's, 'folk' groups grew to encompass multiple cultural subgroups, where any individual could belong to multiple 'folk' groups. The first of these groups is one's family, which has its own unique family folklore. Eventually, various forms of identity such as age, language, ethnicity and occupation developed separate 'Folk' groups. Thus, it is understood that folklore develops from shared identity in any social group. As pointed out by Alan Dundes, "decades of fieldwork have demonstrated that these groups do have their own folklore."

'Folklore' can include jokes, sayings and certain behaviors, always transmitted in an informal manner. It is primarily learned by observation, imitation, repetition or correction by other group members. This informal knowledge is used to confirm and re-enforce the identity of the group. It can be used both internally within the group to express their common identity, for example in an initiation ceremony for new members, or it can be used externally to differentiate the group from outsiders, like a folkdance demonstration at a community festival. Significant to folklorists here is that there are two opposing but equally valid ways to use this in the study of a group: you can start with an identified group in order to explore its folklore, or you can identify folklore items and use them to identify the social group. (Note: The terms emic and etic refer to two different perspectives used in field research by folklorists and other cultural heritage professionals. The word emic applies to the perspective from within the social group; the word etic refers to the perspective from outside the group.)

Even as the identification of folk groups spreads to all areas of our lives, the group most commonly associated with folk art involves the geographic location of a community. The art and artifacts from different communities and different regions are different; the origin of an individual pieces can frequently be recognized by its shape, patterns, and decorations. The "representative art of such societies is not created by its deviants and misfits… but by normal, intelligent, well-adjusted citizens who care deeply about their history and identity. Folk art comes mostly from the central values of a society rather than its fringe elements…" All of these objects are part of the collective identity of a community, who claim them as their own.

=== Defining ‘Art’ ===
During the Middle Ages in Europe, a high proportion of surviving objects, including statues, paintings, drawings, and building arts were directly tied to the messaging and stories of the Roman Catholic church and individual salvation; they were created to the glory of God.

"People did not consider things that were created as means of individual expression; creators simply worked with words or physical materials to construct products that reflected the divine order inherent in all worldly things. … All objects had practical aims; all that was fabricated moved humans toward their quest for salvation. Artisans, by definition, were those who skillfully produced cultural products. The original meaning of the word art, then, was quite clear: it applied to any kind of skill.”

Prior to1500 AD, all material artifacts were created by hand by individual artisans, each of whom was more or less skilled in his or her craft.

With the beginning of the early modern period in the 16th century, a new concept and vocabulary of art and fine art were invented within the western intellectual tradition. During the centuries spanning the late 15th to the late 18th century the emerging middle class in Europe came into their own and sought ways to display their newly minted wealth and power. They began to collect paintings and statues, and to commission new works such as personal portraits. In tandem with these new consumers of art, some few individual artisans were recognized as being exceptional, going on to become the great artists in the period of Renaissance art. In the parlance of this new age, these artisans were said to display individual personal inspiration in their work instead of an exceptional mastery of the age-old practices of their craft. Their works became known as works of art as opposed to the multitude of beautifully crafted objects created during the Middle Ages. Art became exclusive, created by gifted individuals for the limited few.

As part of this new market of fine art for European monied elites, another distinction was introduced between objects which were functional and objects whose only purpose was to create pleasure, i.e. to be aesthetic. The ideas of the Middle Ages were abandoned, in which no distinction was made between the practical and the beautiful in the evaluation of crafted products by either the artisan or the consumer. Replacing them were the ideals of the Renaissance, in which the idea of art as purely aesthetic, lacking any practical purpose, gained credence. This distinction gave rise to the dichotomy of art vs. craft: art was reserved for the elites, everything utilitarian was consigned to the much larger group of functional objects, which were not considered art.

This same early modern period also marked an increasing awareness in Europe that there were other lands and other peoples whose traditions were not European. Christopher Columbus set sail, as one of the first during the Age of Discovery and the concomitant globalization of world history. In the words of Gerald Pocius, Europeans discovered the "other" at this time. These "others" lived somewhere else, in cultures that appeared more cohesive than the contemporary cultures of Europe; their lifestyles seemed integrated and meaningful. Their material culture was also very different than the artifacts common in Europe. These foreign objects were intriguing to the Europeans, however they did not fit in the newly defined genres of "art" and "fine art", which were for the most part confined to painting and sculpture. To get around this, the artifacts of the "other" were labeled as "folk art" or "primitive art", differentiated from the European elite creations, which were "genuine art". These new labels connoted a qualitatively inferior object, the assumption was that they were of a lesser quality than the newly defined European fine arts.

With these new labels introduced during the early modern age, the European ideas of "art" and "fine art" became entrenched, specifically by exclusion of most of the material culture that surrounds us. The truly inspired work of an "artist", for the most part working in the media of either painting or sculpture, was qualitatively different and more than the exceptional objects produced in Europe by a master craftsman. All utilitarian objects were no longer counted as art; they were of an inferior nature, produced by craftsmen and artisans for the community as a whole. "Folk" or "primitive artifacts" produced in other lands by other cultures, as defined by the European Renaissance, were also qualitatively different and less than the works of art produced by European masters. Henry Glassie, a distinguished folklorist studying technology in cultural context, notes that in Turkish one word, sanat, refers to all objects, not distinguishing between art and craft. The latter distinction, Glassie emphasizes, is not based on medium but on social class. Simon Bronner takes this further. "… if the folk art object in the aesthetic view is not social and cultural, then what is it? It is a thinly veiled commodity… It is a cultural statement by its owners rather than by its makers… Folk art here is a matter of economics, of education, and of social status." By 1800, the concept of art for the upper classes only, confined to painting and sculpture, limited to the powerful and wealthy, became the understanding in the European mindset.

The subsequent question becomes how to escape the ethnocentricity of this European concept of art. In his essay on "Art", Gerald Pocius concludes with a definition of art specifically as it applies to material cultural heritage for communities across the globe.

"One of the central defining characteristics, then, of the concept of art must be the criterion of skill… Skills are developed gradually by individuals; they are not acquired automatically, and they are often a matter of degree … Skill manifests itself in a series of operations that produce the cultural behaviors we consider as art. In succinct terms, then, we can define art as the manifestation of a skill that involves the creation of a qualitative experience (often categorized as aesthetic) through the manipulation of whatever forms that are public categories recognized by a particular group. These bring us, then, to the key components of skillful behavior: tradition, group, and emotion.” (Note: Pocius calls out other sources who have advocated for this definition of art, including Richard Anderson, Raymond Firth, Henry Glassie, Michael Owen Jones, George Mills, and Barre Toelken.)

The art of the folk is not about solitary individuals and unique items, it is about skilled artisans living in community, who demonstrate in one or more pieces an exceptional skill, honed over years of practice working in their chosen medium.

=== Labeling ===
The term folk art is a category label, created within the western intellectual tradition to describe objects outside of that tradition. The category is not derived from the object itself like the labeling of a clay pot, which is made of clay and is functionally used as a pot. Instead it is imposed from without, by art critics and consumers who are working out of a different cultural context. In discussing "The Idea of Folk Art", Henry Glassie states the problem succinctly: “Distinctions arise when we view the art of one tradition from the perspective of another…. It’s all a matter of where you stand and where you look.” A set of characteristics to define the category of folk art has been listed above; some of these characteristics are more specific, others less so. This is a category label that has little or no connection with the object itself; instead the connection is to the outsider's perception of the object. Through the process of categorization, the attempt has been made "to systemize and order in an artificial and simplistic fashion that which is extremely complex, sometimes contradictory, and maybe even chaotic." Despite all attempts at categorization by art critics, consumers, marketeers and folklorists, the object itself remains an authentic cultural artifact that some individual somewhere created to address a (real or perceived) need.

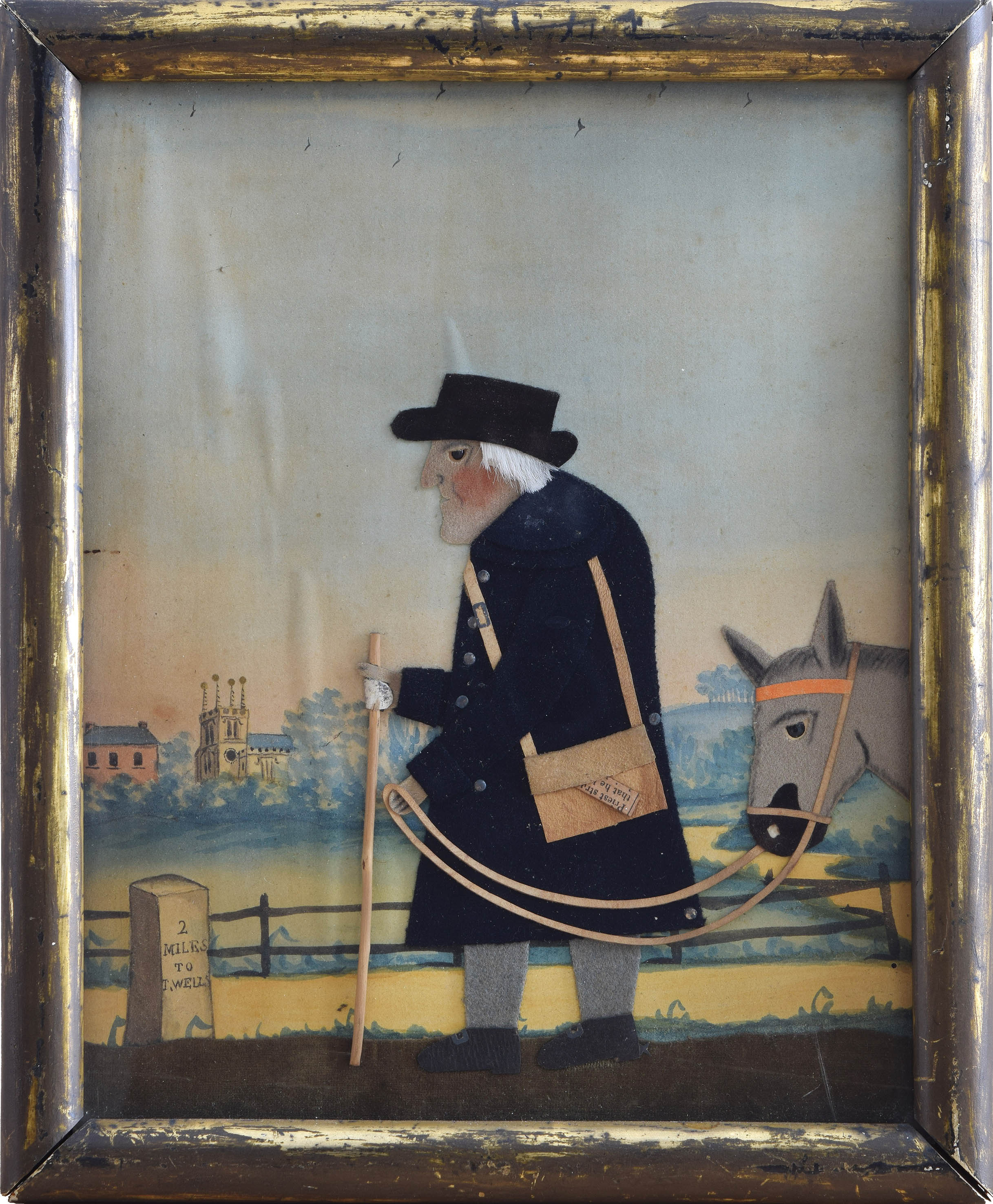
"Old Bright, The Postman", George Smart, c. 1830s

=== Craftsmen, Artisans, and Artists ===
Armed with this definition, it becomes easier to clarify the related terms of craftsman, artisan, and artist. Master craftsmen and artisans, using skills acquired over an extended period of training, can and do create works of art in their chosen medium. This would make these craftsmen and artisans also artists, challenging the current exclusive definition of an artist. Once this conventional aesthetic hierarchy has been eliminated and the component of exclusivity is removed, there is no more and no less in these three labels; craftsman, artisan, and artist all include a high level of skill in their given media. Professionals in their respective fields, they recognize and embrace the familiar styles with which they are surrounded. While the shared form and motifs indicate a shared culture, the artisan is free to tease out individual elements and manipulate them to form a new permutation within the tradition. "For art to progress, its unity must be dismantled so that certain of its aspects can be freed for exploration, while others shrink from attention." Innovation allows the individual artisan to represent his own vision, making the creative tension between the traditional object and the craftsman visible in these exceptional objects. George Kubler addresses this issue by re-labeling them all, craftsman, artisan, artist as homo faber, man who creates.

=== Colloquial (mis)understanding in America ===
An earlier, more general understanding of folk art had been developed in America during the Colonial Revival period at the beginning of the 20th century. Between the decades 1880 and 1940 as the country became an urban industrial society, Americans looked back nostalgically to their rural agricultural beginnings. All things antiquated, hand-made, old-fashioned came into vogue, particularly by the upper classes of the East Coast. Removed from their original context of production and utility within the local community, these objects were valued as standalone curiosities from an earlier time in American history. Originally labeled antiques, they became re-labeled as folk art during the first decades of the 20th century by both museum professionals and art marketeers. "Folk was a market term to separate a commodity from the fine arts above and the antiques below." This shift in terminology opened up folk art to designate anything that was other, outsider, isolate, visionary.

Despite single voices disputing this inclusive labeling throughout the first half of the last century, it remained entrenched in the vocabulary of the museums and gallery owners, for all items which might more correctly be labeled as Americana. It was at the mid-point of the century, at the same time that folklore as performance began to dominate the discussions, and professionals of folkloristics and cultural history became more selective in what they wanted to label as folk art. When we circumscribe the folk in folk community, then we will automatically circumscribe folk art. There is still variance in the understanding of the folk arts, but for students of cultural history it becomes clear that the folk in folk art are active, committed members within a community, they are not the outliers, isolates, or visionaries on the edges.

=== Related terminology ===
Listed below are a wide-ranging assortment of labels for an eclectic group of art works. All of these genres are created outside of the institutional structures of the art world, they are not considered "fine art". There is undoubtedly overlap between these labeled collections, such that an object might be listed under two or more labels. Many of these groupings and individual objects might also resemble "folk art" in one aspect or another, without however meeting the defining characteristics listed above. As our understanding of art expands beyond the confines of the "fine arts", each of these types needs to be included in the discussion.

- Americana
- Art brut
- Folk Environments
- Genre paintings
- Naïve art
- Outlier art
- Outsider art
- Primitive art
- Tramp art
- Tribal art
- Vanguard art
- Vernacular art
- Visionary art

== American folk artists ==
When folk art first became recognized as distinctive and valuable in its own right during the 19th century, it was the object itself that was valued. Its creation was attributed to communal processes in which the identity of the individual artist was of no consequence, lost in some nebulous collective anonymity. This mapped into the ideas of romantic nationalism spreading across the western world at the time. That said, a few early folklorists did stress the significance of the individual skill and intentions of the artist. One of these was the Austrian Alois Riegl in his study of Volkskunst, Hausfleiss, und Hausindustrie, published 1894. Riegl recognized that the individual artist was crucial in the process of creativity and transmission of folk art objects. Despite this early appreciation of their work, it took another 50 years for folk artists to acquire the recognition they merit, no longer eclipsed by the constricted spotlight on the individual object.

By the middle of the 20th century, the shifting focus across all areas of the folklore studies moved toward an appreciation of folklore as human behavior and communication; it was no longer isolated in the individual artifacts. The new vocabulary of performance and context transformed folklore into actions and redefined the job of folklorists. This dramatic shift in focus can be seen in multiple studies. Henry Glassie exhorts his readers to "Begin not with the artifacts that are precious because we covet them, but with a human being in the instance of creation." He wants them to start at the beginning of the creative process, not just "nitpick" at the end result. John Vlach asks his students to consider folk art within its original generative contexts, in the folk artist and his environment, where the "cultural significance of folk art can be found".

In 1975 Michael Owen Jones published one of the first studies on an individual folk artist, a chair maker of rural Kentucky. He maintains that "an object cannot be fully understood or appreciated without knowledge of the man who made it". By delving into production techniques and expressive behavior, Jones attempts to gain insight into the creative thinking of this individual. He does this by exploring a multitude of different facets involved in the chair production, including tools, materials, construction techniques, customer preference, mistakes made, the beliefs and aspirations of the chair maker, and more. Other studies of individual folk artists followed.

By the beginning of the 21st century, the full depth of the creative process of the folk artist is highlighted by Wertkin in his introduction to the "Encyclopedia of American Folk Art"

"In fact, when the surface is scratched, the full complexity of each artist and his or her work becomes apparent. Facile and narrow labels that reduce the creative spirit to a single dimension are of little significance in the long run, especially when they obscure the multiplicity of intentions, ideas, meanings, influences, connections, and references inherent in every work of art. Whatever nomenclature (labeling) is used, the art and artists … are essential to an understanding of the American experience in its fullness."

=== Individual studies ===
- Burrison, John; Glassie, Henry (2010). From Mud to Jug: The Folk Potters and Pottery of Northeast Georgia. Wormsloe Foundation Publication.
- Glassie, Henry (1976). Folk Housing in Middle Virginia: Structural Analysis of Historic Artifacts. Univ of Tennessee Press. ISBN 9780870491733.
- Jones, Michael Owen (1975). The Handmade Object and its Maker. Berkeley, Los Angeles, London: University of California.
- Upton, Dell (1997). Holy Things and Profane: Anglican Parish Churches in Colonial Virginia. Yale University.
- Vlach, John Michael (1992). Charleston Blacksmith: The Work of Philip Simmons. University of South Carolina.

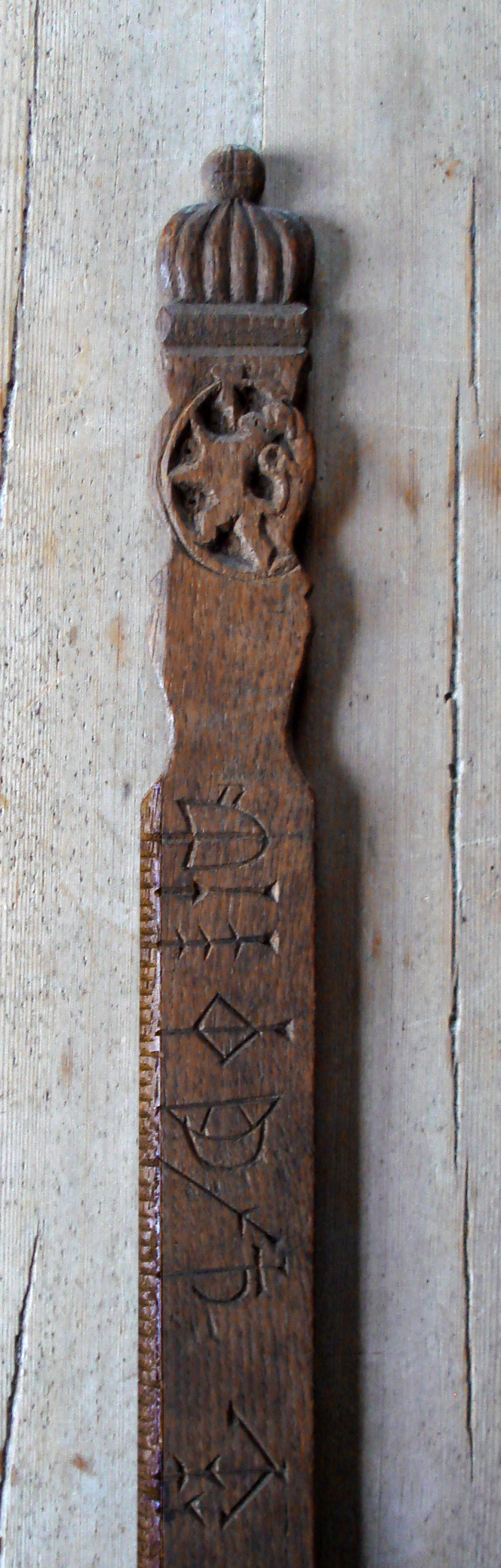
Detail of 17th century calendar stick carved with national coat of arms, a common motif in Norwegian folk art

== Workshops and Apprentices ==
=== Nineteenth century ===
In 1801, the villages and country sides of North America were littered with skilled craftsmen serving the local populace. The main economy was rural, most people lived and worked on farms to provide shelter and food for themselves and their families. Local artisans were an exception; they had the means to make specialized products that were not easily produced on the individual farmsteads. Using simple, often handmade tools, manual techniques, and local materials, these craftsmen devoted more time to their craft than they did to any patch of land they were cultivating. The products they made for other households became their main source of income, although the payment was frequently in goods instead of currency. The workshops of these craftsmen were incorporated into the family homestead. It frequently became a social center in the village, a meeting place to hear and exchange news.

Folk artisans were trained in their trade in one of several ways, including through family lines where a parent would pass knowledge and tools onto their children to continue working in the skilled craft. This training would occur in a natural setting; children would be pulled into tasks in the workshop as they grew into them. Growing children were considered an economic resource for any family. Another way to learn a specialized skill was in an apprenticeship. A young person would become a trainee in a workshop of a local artisan to learn the trade and have a profession with which to earn a living. This was an option for young people who did not want to farm, or for children in large families where the arable land was not enough to feed a new generation of family members.

Towns in 1801 offered a larger variety of options for residents to acquire goods. Alongside the artisans, there were also shops which sold imported products. These were for the most part handcrafted objects, because industrial manufacturing had only reached a few industries in 1801: weaving and textiles, iron founding, and steam power. Some few artisans whose customers were the economically elite were only located in the towns and cities; these were the goldsmiths, silversmiths and glassblowers.

=== Twentieth century ===
In 1901, the Industrial Revolution created mass migration to cities for people to work in factories. People began going to work at a location outside of the home, or stayed at home and did piece work for later assembly by someone else. Rural populations involved in agriculture decreased as the numbers of urban working poor grew.

The continued influx of immigrants into North America included many skilled artisans, who brought the tools and traditions of their handicrafts with them. These master craftsmen looked for opportunities in their new country to use these skills, train apprentices and imprint their new communities with folk objects from their European heritage. In 1932 Allen H. Eaton, published a book "Immigrant Gifts to American Life" which showcased the arts and skills of foreigners at the Buffalo Exhibition. Eaton pays tribute to the gifts of the new Americans in his forward. “[The immigrant] has brought to his newly chosen country, … treasures in the form of beautiful skills and crafts. By this approach his gifts were gladly received and cherished in the hope that their roots might strike deeply into the new soil to which they were being transplanted."

For the skilled craftsmen, a powerful competitor had entered the field. By 1901, the mail order catalog of Sears & Roebuck was running a very successful mail order business across the United States. As roads became better and canal systems were expanded, the price of these manufactured products continued to drop. Their catalog of over 500 pages of products reached into all corners of rural America offering manufactured items of identical quality and set price; more and more people bought manufactured goods delivered through the mail instead of one-offs from the local artisan. Consumers learned to value identical products, manufactured by machines without the individual stamp of the local workshop. The rural artisan making single orders on demand, and the local general store could no longer compete. Many of the handicrafts began to die out with a declining demand, and the workshops that were left "ceased being a maker and became a repairer of manufactured objects."

It was during the decades around the turn into the 20th century in households that had moved into the cities that the roles of men and women became more sharply delineated. As the men went off to work, the women were left to tend to the home and the children. The girls stayed closer; it was easier to school them in domestic handicrafts. The boys were expected to follow their fathers into the factory or the mine. The women that did go to work in the factories were valued for their ability to do “delicate” precision work with their smaller hands and attention to detail.

The only place where the traditional role of the local artisan and workshop of the previous century continued was in closed social religious communities which do not use 20th century technology, such as the Amish and Mennonites. The artisans in these communities continue to make the hand tools needed to maintain their rural lifestyle, and also to find or invent acceptable technical ways to bridge the gap between themselves and the modern world which surrounds them.

=== Twenty-first century ===
By 2001 a significant cultural shift had occurred in Western culture with increasing emphasis on individuality and originality, not tradition. For example, Sears & Roebuck had been replaced by shopping malls, then replaced with Amazon. The learning and teaching of many crafts has moved out of the village and into contemporary systems of formalized training. Some European countries continue to incorporate apprenticeship positions in their schooling while others have abandoned this approach for extended schooling in technical and applied arts schools with specialized equipment.

Folk objects are composed of natural materials, crafting them will always be a hands-on event. The students, under direction of master craftsmen, learn the difference in touch and feel of the raw substance. "The conversion from natural object to artifact is accomplished with skill and time. … We can study the process of creation in distinctive stages because the process is deliberate ….the maker commonly controls the steps of production from start to finish." The goal is to learn what has worked before for the materials, the artisan, and the consumer. In the workshop, students have the opportunity to practice and perfect the skills necessary for their craft. These skills are not learned in isolation, there must be an experienced craftsman involved in the learning process. Along with the manual and design skills taught and learned in the school, the students also learn to run a successful small business. In the transmission of these skills in technical schools, one could argue that the folk community has been lost, or that the community has re-defined itself for the 21st century.

Further, in 1901 consumers preferred products mass-manufactured in new factories, that all looked and worked the same. By 2001, the unique, hand crafted item had become more desirable due to the pervasiveness of factory-made utensils and items of daily use. Whereas hand-crafted utensils used to be more prevalent, the products of an artisan are now more desirable, in less supply and therefore more expensive. 21st century demands may be summarised by the following- the "hand-made item has, for many purchasers, a prestige or glamour that factory-produced items cannot match."

A third major shift in the folk crafts in the 21st century is that many traditional crafts have become home hobbies for many, regardless of their community of origin. As the century progresses further into electronics and mind work, the value of handicrafts, i.e. working with your hands, comes to the forefront in discussions on health and well-being. In this activity the artisan moves into a different mental zone, absorbed in something outside of himself, separate and distinct from the rational mindset of most of our waking hours. A quilter in Ohio says "If I want to unwind, I pick up my quilt. It's pleasure, it's leisure. It's something I do for me…" These skills can be learned in a classroom, but more commonly they are taught and learned on-line, where the pool of engaged students extends world-wide. These new novice students need tools and materials which master craftsmen can now package and supply, opening an important new market for their expertise.

This presents a significant problem for the study of folk art objects. The crafts are age-old and traditional, the tools and methods are also pre-industrial, however the community is new, and is rapidly becoming a global community. The valuation of these new folk hobbyists by professionals of cultural heritage varies. Warren Roberts says they lack tradition. "While crafts pursued as hobbies testify to the vitality of the crafts and to the important social role…the element of tradition is largely lacking when designs and techniques are learned mainly from books, so that we would not be justified in considering hobbies as folk crafts." In his essay on "Folk Objects", Bronner describes much of this handicraft "as a commentary on contemporary industrial society. The [objects] speak for handwrought, personal, and rural values as against the machine-wrought uniformities of factory production." In the introduction to "Folk Art and Art Worlds", the cultural values embedded in folk art are highlighted. Many regional exhibitions "typically focus on living traditions and present folk art as a creative expression that signifies ethnic, regional, religious, familial or occupational identity." Perhaps the problem does not lie in the objects themselves but rather in our definitions of folk, tradition and community.

=== Materials, forms, and crafts ===
The list below includes a sampling of different materials, forms, and artisans involved in the production of everyday and folk art objects.

- Alebrije
- Armourer
- Basketry
- Bellmaker
- Blacksmith
- Boat building
- Brickmaker
- Broommaker
- Cabinetry
- Carpentry
- Carpentry
- Ceramics
- Chillum
- Clockmaker
- Cooper
- Coppersmith
- Cutler
- Drystone Mason
- Ex-voto
- Farrier
- Foodways
- Fraktur
- Furniture
- Gunsmith
- Harness maker
- Ironwork
- Jewelry
- Kuthiyottam
- Latin American Retablos
- Leather crafting
- Lei (garland)
- Ljuskrona
- Locksmith
- Lubok
- Madhubani painting
- Masonry
- Metalworking
- Millwright
- Miniatures or Models
- Nakshi Kantha
- Needlework
- Painting
- Pakistani vehicle art
- Pewterer
- Phad painting
- Quilting
- Recycled materials
- Ropemaker
- Saddler
- Sawsmith
- Sculpture
- Shoemaker
- Spooner
- Stonemason
- Tanner
- Textiles
- Thatcher
- Tile maker
- Tinker
- Tinsmith
- Tools
- Toys
- Treenware
- Turning
- Vernacular architecture
- Wainwright
- Weaver
- Wheelwright
- Whirligig
- Wood carving

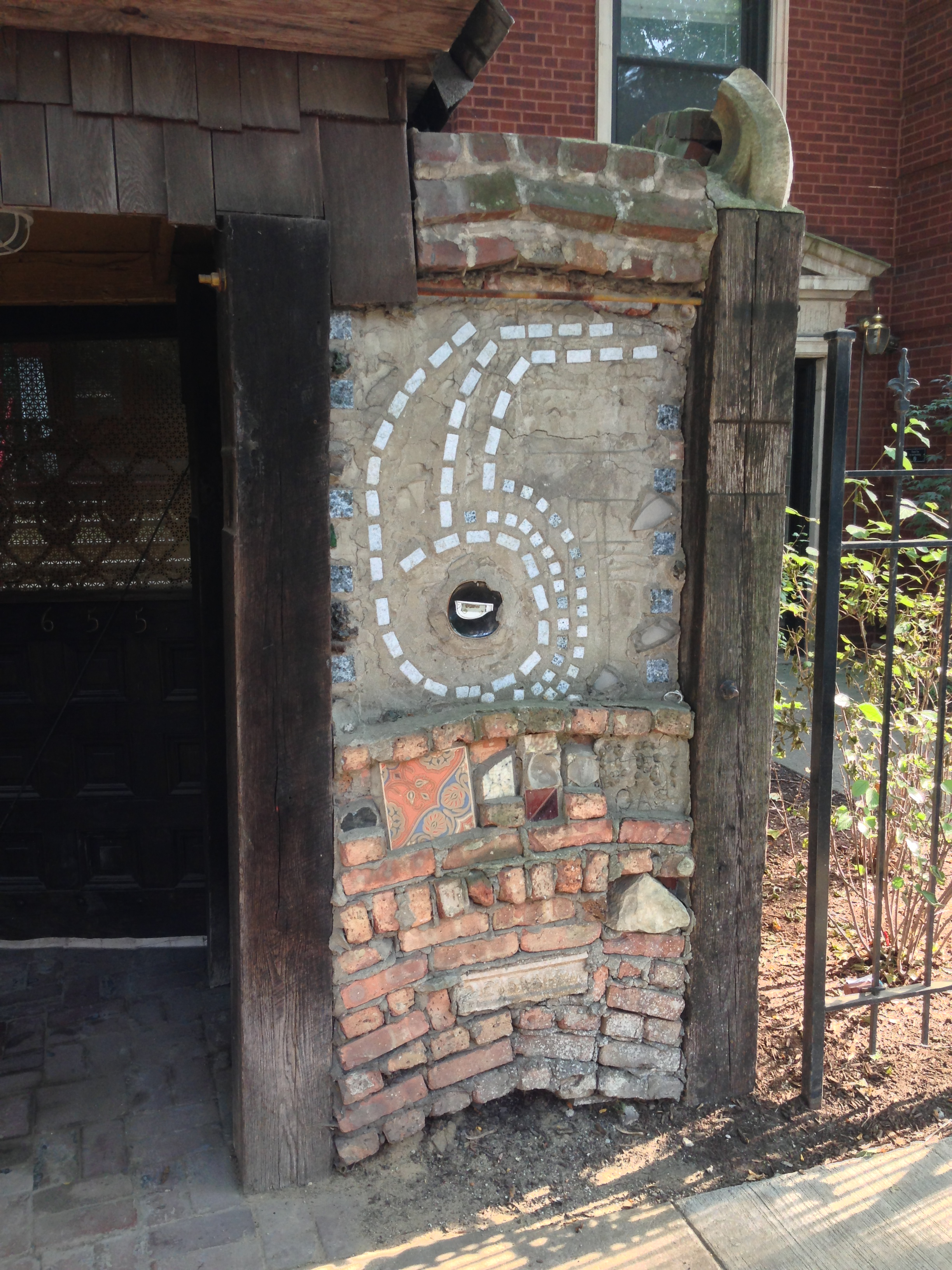
A folk art wall in Lincoln Park, Chicago

== Owned by the community ==
Simon Bronner's essay "Folk Objects" discusses the array of objects created within traditional cultures, of which folk art objects are a subset of. There is a lack of consensus around what makes individual objects stand out as 'art'.

Because of their standard form, folk objects are recognized as familiar within the community. Similar objects can be found either in the contemporary or the historical environment; the primary features that have made it a ‘useful’ object remain stable. Individual pieces of folk art will always reference other works in the culture, even as they display variations in some aspect of the form or design. To express this in the negative, if antecedents for this object cannot be found in the community, it might still be a piece of art, but it is not folk art. Replication is also the goal of the folk artist. He or she does not strive for innovation, but instead wants to create an object that resembles an existing object, to duplicate the known ‘good’ style of the community. Being part of the community, the craftsman is well aware of the community aesthetics, and how members of the local culture will respond to the work. They strive to create an object which matches community expectations, working within (mostly) unspoken cultural biases to confirm and strengthen the existing model. (Note: In his work at the end of the 19th century, Riegl identified 2 characteristics which are essential in recognizing folk objects: “1) individual forms must be known, understood and used by all members of a culture regardless of class distinctions and 2) the forms of folk art must be associated with tradition, i.e. a practice which has continued and not changed over a long period of time”.(Rahmen 2007, p. 2) That statement of 150 years ago still stands.)

With a defined form and measurable standards, these objects can then be sorted in a series through time and space. "An object's ability to be measured allows for the expression of repetition and variation in exact and comparable units. Measurement helps us describe standards of form within a culture." How did the usage and shape change over generations? Can these same forms be found in other regions? (Note: Bronner uses the example of the stone homes dotting the landscape of Utah. These were built by European stone masons who had emigrated to American and converted to Mormonism. Using local materials, they applied the skills brought from Europe to build homes in this new land. (Bronner 1986, p. 210)) This enables the study of these forms using the Historical-Geographical method of folklore studies. The progressive transformations of the known form can be tracked as the form is simplified, enriched, improved in its utility.

A series of folk objects in a given form also tracks changes in the pattern, symmetry and ornamentation introduced by different artisans working with this form. No two hand-crafted items are identical. While the shared form indicates a shared culture, deviations in the form give voice to an individual artisan. The craftsmen creating these folk objects are not unknown; even without their names, they have frequently left an individual stamp on their work. Sometimes these deviations in the production are unintentional, just part of the process. But sometimes these deviations are intentional; the artisan wants to play with the boundaries of expectation and add their own creative touch. They perform within the tension of conserving the recognized form and adding innovation. The folklorist Barre Toelken identifies this tension as "... a combination of both changing ("dynamic") and static ("conservative") elements that evolve and change through sharing, communication and performance." Over time, the cultural context within the community shifts and morphs: new leaders, new technologies, new values, new awareness. Gerald Pocius uses different words to articulate this phenomenon. “Art manipulates traditions rather than being constrained by them. Art involves creation. And all creation is partly culturally based. Artists live in a particular time period and in a particular place. Thus creation never occurs completely in a vacuum; it must involve choice of techniques, as well as content, that are all culturally influenced and learned…. Art involves the relation between "individual creativity and the collective order," In its most basic form, creativity is memories reconfigured. For folk art objects, the interplay between tradition and individual innovation is much more visible than in other forms of folklore performance.

== Utility of the object ==
A book on the history of art was published in 1962: The Shape of Time: Remarks on the History of Things. Written by George Kubler, a scholar of pre-Columbian art and architecture of middle and South America, the book abandons the concepts of "artistic style" to place all art, and in fact all human artifacts, on a continuum of physical modifications of shape. Kubler starts out with the premise that originally "every man-made thing arises from a problem as a purposeful solution." He goes on to explain how, throughout human history, the main reason to make something, i.e. an artifact, was in response to a recognized need by an individual or a community. With this, Kubler offers the theoretical foundation for the utilitarian foundation of folk art objects in general.

One of the primary characteristics of folk art objects is the connection, either immediate or historical, to a recognized function within its community. The identification of a utilitarian prototype is much easier with some objects than with others. Household items, tools, houses all have a very clear purpose and use; they must be functional as well as aesthetically pleasing. If the decorated pitcher drips every time it is used to pour, if the ornate cupboard door does not close all the way, if the roof leaks, if the object does not work as intended then its value and assessment is immediately reduced. This explains the consistency of its form over time, for even the most ornate object is shaped for a specific usage. But what is the utility of a painting hung on the wall, or a small carving of an animal on the shelf? How do these representations of a familiar scene in the life of the community, either as a graphic image or a sculpture, serve any purpose other than to decorate? Here we come to the historic purpose of representational objects of folk art, now perhaps obsolete, but originally the function of these art forms. Kubler formulated this succinctly: “Sculpture and painting convey distinct messages… These communications or iconographic themes make the utilitarian and rational substructure of any aesthetic achievement. Thus structure, technique, and iconography all belong to the non-artistic underpinnings” of these objects.

Since the advent of public education for all children a basic literacy both in words and numbers is assumed; this is relatively new. Public schooling in western countries was introduced during the 19th century, less than 200 years ago. Before that time, pictures and illustrations were used to tell a story, to document knowledge, to pass on information. This can be most clearly seen in the iconography of the church. Each saint was assigned an attribute as an identification marker. With this attribute, the saints and their stories were immediately recognizable to the populace, regardless of the workmanship of the piece. Graphic representations of community knowledge was the lingua franca of the world before public schooling and general literacy was introduced. (Note: We are moving back to that with the explosion of icons used in electronic discourse. See Icon (computing)) These graphic images of community life and knowledge were used for documenting, training, teaching, innovating both within the community and without. The painter Pieter Bruegel the Elder and his relatives illustrated this in many of their paintings and drawings. They rendered both landscapes and scenes of rural life to portray the life and language of the common man. The details in these graphics have long been studied by folklorists to gain insight into contemporary life of those times. (Note: In one Mennonite community of the 21st century, this remains an important function. Where the members do not use photographs, the Mennonite painter "Anna serves as community documentarian and artist, functions which contribute to group identity".(Bronner 1986a, p. 137)) These illustrated representations of community life have now become more decorative; the original functions have been replaced by the rise in literacy and the explosion of easily accessible printed materials. Nevertheless, they still tell the story of the community to both insiders and to outsiders.

Another type of folk art is seen in the many models found in communities; for the most part these now sit on shelves in a home as decorations. Yet these small reproductions were created for a purpose. One reason to create a model is to gain proficiency in woodworking, or any other chosen medium. Skill involves practice, and the creation of miniatures involves more manual dexterity than making the full-scale object. Models were made by craftsmen to practice the skills needed for their work. "Learning to carve…was a playful way to learn the properties of woods, to use tools, and to solve technical problems." A model might also be created to test out a new design before investing in the full-scale model. "Model building is fundamental in science, and that models must be reviewed frequently to test their viability, it is also clear that model building is a practical endeavor". Models can also be toys, but as any parent knows, toys are first and foremost tools to acquaint a child with the varied components of their home and community: the doll house, the play tool set, etc. All of these enable a child to learn and practice skills needed as adults in their community. And in contemporary times, the marketing of models has become a lucrative small business, catering to outside visitors to the community. Models make very handy souvenirs for the tourist to take home, as they are small, handy and easily packed.

Attributing a utilitarian function to all folk art objects directly contradicts the idea that art is that which is not practical; instead its only purpose is to generate an aesthetic response in others. The contradiction has been problematic as folklorists try to squeeze folk art, with its overriding utilitarian nature, into the framework defined by the European idea of fine arts. Gerald Pocius states that "Historically, the issue of whether items were useful or artistic was central to the concept of what constituted art. What was considered art was limited to those things with elaboration beyond the point of utility." Henry Glassie, referencing his extensive work on Folk Housing in Middle Virginia, argues that there are few material objects in the folk tradition that can be legitimately separated from their contexts as objects of art. The only common one, according to Glassie, is the dooryard garden, a product of the aesthetic application of the farmer's tools, techniques, and expertise. This gratuitous patch of beauty co-exists in the same landscaping plan as the woodpile, dungheap, and outhouse. Folk art objects do not come out of the academy, and it might be considered inappropriate to evaluate them according to the fine arts criteria for art. For folk art, the utility of the item is an integral part of its aesthetics.

== Aesthetics of the genre ==
Henry Glassie highlights that "the ideal in complicated Western folk designs was to form a symmetrical whole through the repetition of individually symmetrical units." It is this repetition that "proves the absence of mistake and presence of control," providing "the traditional repetitive-symmetrical aesthetic" of Western folk art.

Further perspectives on the ideal aesthetics of Western folk are outlined below:

=== Artisans ===
Artisans are skilled smart competent craftsmen, men and women who spend a lifetime honing the skills needed to produce objects of note. In the process of creating multiple objects, they develop their own style and an individual taste for what they like and don't like. In talking with them, it becomes clear that the top priority is always to make an object that works well; if it is not very functional, then it fails the first test of the artist. Only after the assessment of actual utility, will they venture on to evaluate, and value, the aesthetic design of the object. "The modern designer … recognizes the simultaneity of the artefact's aesthetic and practical functioning….often denies his aesthetic, defending his choices and actions solely on the basis of utility." As part of the (secondary) aesthetic evaluation of the object, an artist might consider innovation of either the form or the decorative elements, however that will subordinate to the object's functionality. Innovation will also mainly occur in dialogue with their customers, with agreement on the balance between tradition and innovation. At the same time, these master craftsmen maintain a level of excellence within their peer group. They are "scornful of shoddy work. Most of the old makers were careful, skilled weavers. … great love for that tradition of excellence…. " At the same time, there is little financial reward for the long hours involved in crafting an exceptional object.

=== For community insiders ===
For consumers within the community of the artisan, their first priority is also that the object works well. They acquire it to use, in their household or on their properties, in the traditional tasks of home and community. Secondarily, the local consumer is looking for something familiar, the recognized ‘good’ style of the community. They want something that fits in with other tools and utensils that they own; they want something known and familiar, comparable to comfort food in the traditions of foodways. The local consumer is not looking for innovation. In more academic language, Vlach maintains that "folk art resonate[s] with the richness of cultural profundity… they are good because they are familiar." As local customers, they also want a pricing which is reasonable within the local market, whether that be in currency or in barter.

=== For visitors and tourists ===
The outsider to the community, the visitor or tourist, is looking for something unique and engaging as a reminder of their trip; this folk art memento has to be something that the visitor cannot find in his home community. These mementos are for the most part not purchased to be used, but rather to have and display. The object becomes "a cultural statement by its owners rather than by its makers... shaped by consumers more than by producers". It defines the consumer, who is both well-traveled and well-heeled, as well as the artisan. In highlighting and framing a single item outside of its cultural context, all of the stories and traditions embodied in that object are stripped away. It becomes just an isolated object, an artifact of the heritage industry.

=== For curators, collectors and art marketeers ===
Art marketeers, including gallery owners, museum curators, and collectors of traditional art, have a very different and somewhat controversial agenda in their interest in folk art. For them, the object itself is central, while the history and context become secondary. These consumers have been trained in the culture of the western European fine arts, and they use these (external) criteria to evaluate traditional folk art objects. This was also common practice for folklorists before World War II, when artifacts were considered to be remnants from earlier societies. This changed in the 1950s as students of cultural heritage began to understand these artifacts in the wider context of their present-day communities. While professional folklorists changed their approach mid-century to encompass this new, expanded understanding of folk artifacts within their communities, professionals in the fine arts retained their focus on the isolated object, as a museum display (curators), as an addition to their private collection, or as a piece to offer for sale (art marketeers).

It also become evident in the second half of the 20th century that the label ‘folk’ was itself a value-add to any old object. "Because of enthusiasm for these….by antique collectors, many handmade objects that had been called antique were now called folk." Bronner notes that "folk represented an appealing romantic, nativist qualifier used in the marketplace. For those stressing the folk, it represented a sense of community and informal learning…" He goes on to note that this "categorization [in the western market] established folk art as a tradable commodity," with an uptick in advertisements across magazines marketing antiques. It was during these decades that a split between the professionals in folklore studies and art collectors became evident, with both groups claiming authority and expertise in the now diverging field of "folk art". (Note: Gallerists continue to associate folk art objects to styles in the fine arts. "We have since learned to beware… that visual similarities between modern [fine] art and folk art can be accounted for by assuming identical aesthetic values." (Vlach & Bronner 1992, p. xviii)) It became evident that "Not insignificantly, the politics of the marketplace have had an impact on the development of terminology…" The new field of museum folklore now assumes a position of intermediary between the interested parties.

Marketing works better when you have a star performer, and so the art market went out to find them. This is in direct contradiction to the basic values of folk art objects, which have always been recognized as community goods. For one group of Mennonites, a painter is valued within the community for her art. "It serves her community in a traditional, symbolic manner, and it maintains continuity with … tradition." In contrast, western culture favors individual heroes, those men and women who stand apart from and above the rest of us. And so the National Endowment for the Arts has recognized over 400 national heritage fellows since 1982, heroes in the preservation of traditional crafts. These include folk artists working in quilting, ironwork, woodcarving, pottery, embroidery, basketry, weaving, and other related traditional arts. According to NEA guidelines, they must display "authenticity, excellence, and significance within a particular tradition." This designation comes with grants, a national platform for performance, and a greatly expanded market for their art work.

The designation also comes at a cost. Artisans now focus their attention beyond the home community; that which they did more or less non-reflectively within their communities, they now evaluate in an expanded perspective. Fame becomes a growing factor in their businesses and their lives. The market is interested in their product; it becomes a commodity, bringing with it a sense of entitlement on the part of the consumer. A "small change here and another there, that they have slowly but surely undermined and finally replaced this rich tradition…. The customer's demand for small and thus inexpensive items has taken over, tilting production toward wall hangings, pillows, and the ubiquitous potholder." As the reputation of these master craftsmen grows, "individual purchasers, small shop owners and their sales reps, crafts fair and bazaar managers, large department store and mail order catalog buyers, philanthropic organizations... actively engaged in tailoring the products…" to sell.

In time, the individual artisan becomes aware of the potential for exploitation. It is nice to earn good money, it represents the value society places on their artistry, and a personal recognition of their work. And yet for many folk artists, the price paid for their hand-crafted product does not even match the minimum wage requirement for the hours they spend on crafting each item. (Note: For a more extensive discussion of the economic exploitation of folk artists see Robert Teske, Crafts Assistance Programs’ and Traditional Crafts, (Teske 1986)) It is the art marketeers who effect the translation from the folk economy to the mainstream art economy, a process in which a single item is removed from its context, and the artist is portrayed as a single individual instead of one link in a long chain of traditional artisans in the community. "Identifying names of makers builds a system of [modern] consumption… a social agreement of dealers and collectors for marking services." With name recognition of the traditional artist, their craft and their product is removed from the community to be marketed in the western consumer economy, and becomes a commodity reflective more of the person who buys it than of the master craftsman.

=== For scholars ===
It is the scholars who pick up on this concern of exploitation, where the "matters of marketing and exhibiting folk art, and the ethical treatment of folk artists and their communities…". are studied. For folklorists personally know these men and women, these folk artists, and some of them might even be counted as friends. In interactions with the artisans, the folklorist is looking to clarify the authenticity of the objects as well as their context within the community in evaluating a piece of art. Both Henry Glassie and Michael Jones have advocated for the cultural heritage scholar to go further in actually helping individual folk artists locate appropriate markets and pricing their work for the upscale market.

This moves into a further intrusion of the researcher in a process, in which the presence of an outsider (read folklore fieldworker) changes the behavior of the individuals involved in the research; this is known as the Hawthorne effect. Jones muses over this in his work with the Cumberland chairmaker. "[N]ot all researchers admit the extent to which they may have been responsible for the condition; frequently the researcher … offered new tools… asked personal questions… objects for a museum… in comparisons presented a new model … provided an audience… questions about objects raised the value of them for the owner. …Many things that occurred might not have been had I not been present…" As our communities change and develop, these traditional crafts need to be documented and supported, but in doing so, scholars need to be cautious not to destroy or distort the very thing which they value.

== Associations ==
- Folk Art Society of America
- UNESCO Organization of Folk Art
- National Endowment for the Arts
- CIOFF: International Council of Organizations of Folklore Festivals and Folk Arts
- Pennsylvania Folklore: Woven Together TV Program on textile arts
