= George Smart (tailor) =

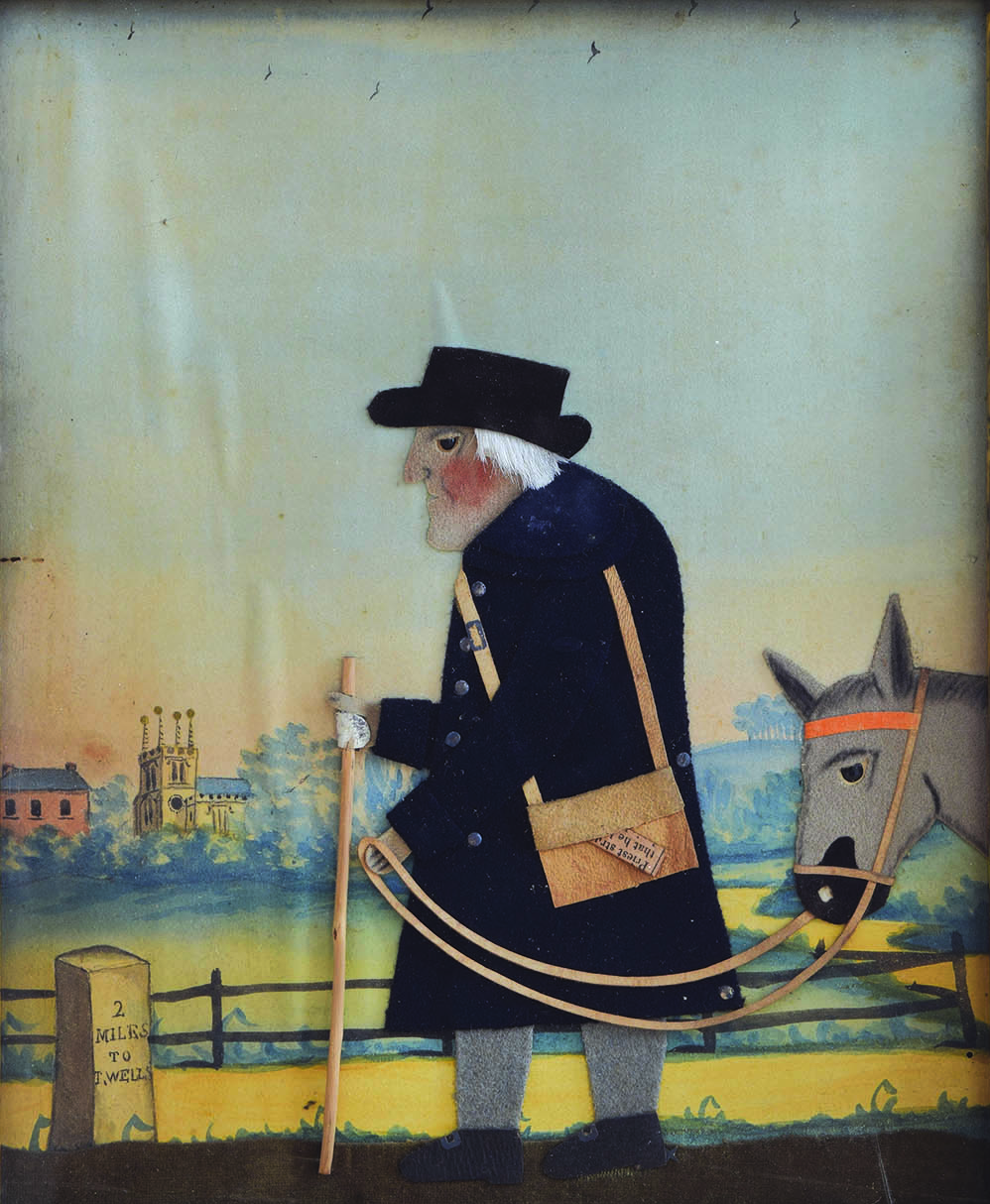
"Old Bright, The Postman" by George Smart, c.1830s.

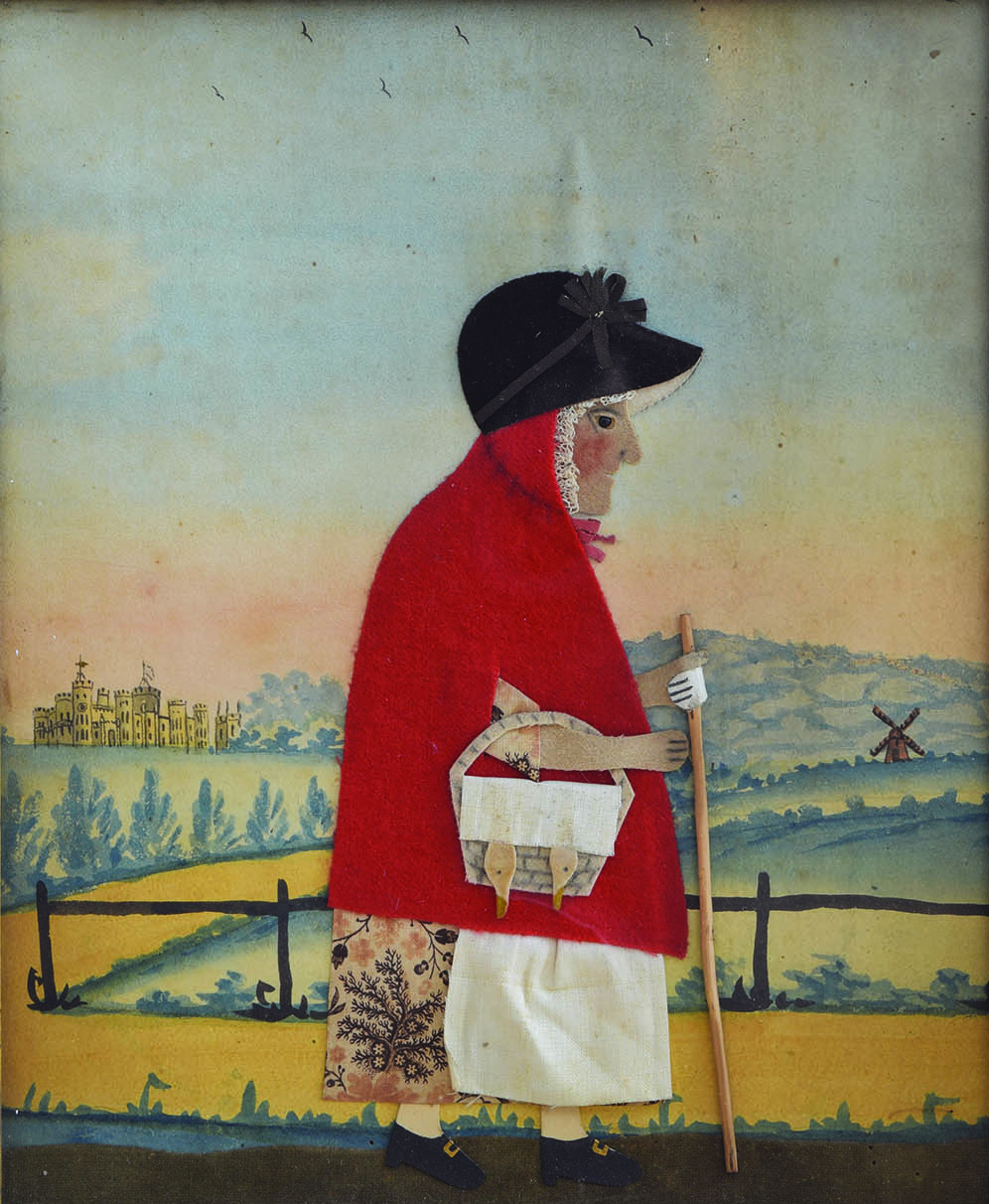
"The Goosewoman" by George Smart, c.1830s.

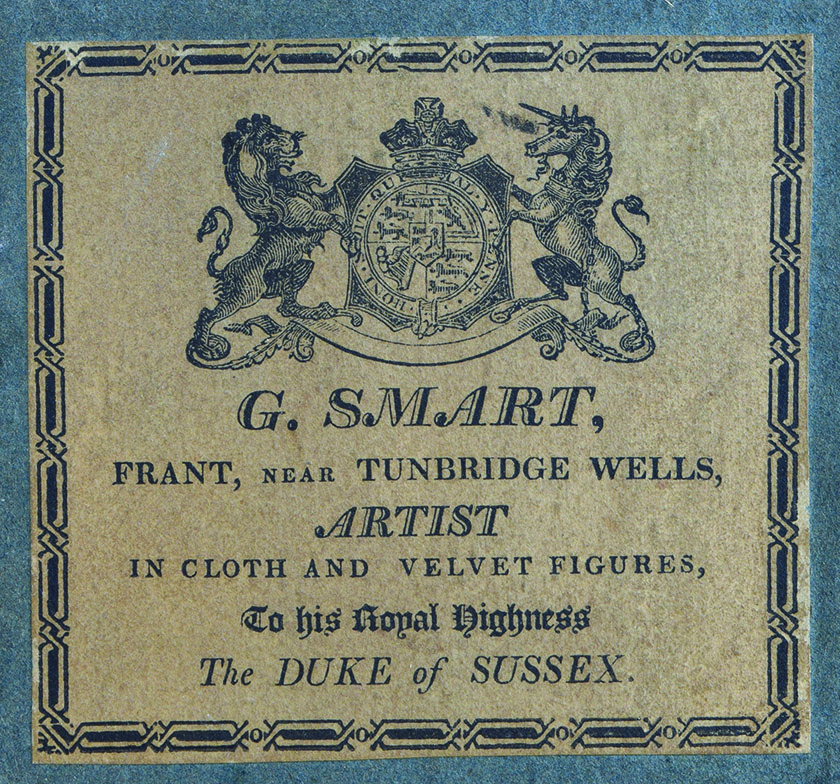
Label on the reverse of the Goosewoman picture by George Smart, c.1830s.

George Smart (1774-1846) was an English tailor and folk artist notable for his cloth collage portraits and felt covered dummyboards. He lived in Frant, a village in East Sussex, England. His artworks were mentioned in several guidebooks of the time that encouraged tourists to visit his shop. His most notable subjects were Old Bright, the local postman and The Goosewoman. The Tunbridge Wells Museum owns ten examples of his work and Compton Verney Art Gallery in Warwickshire has two pictures.

In the summer of 2014, twenty one artworks by George Smart were included in Tate Britain's "British Folk Art" exhibition, the first time his work had been gathered together in a major gallery and in such quantity. These included all the examples of his work owned by the Tunbridge Wells Museum, Kent.

Until recently he has mostly been the subject of a few paragraphs in Folk art compendiums, but is now recognised as one of the key figures within the history of English Folk Art. Unusually for a Folk Artist, he is the known creator of around 100 works

The first monograph on Smart called, George Smart: The Tailor of Frant, Artist in Cloth & Velvet Figures was published in the UK in March 2016.
