= Cecil Wedgwood =

- Born: 28 March 1863; Barlaston, Staffordshire, England
- Died: 3 July 1916 (aged 53); La Boiselle, France
- Burial place: Bapaume Post Military Cemetery
- Military career
- Allegiance: United Kingdom
- Branch: British Army
- Rank: Major
- Commands: 7th (Service) Battalion, North Staffordshire Regiment
- Conflicts: Second Boer War; First World War; *Battle of the Somme

Major Cecil Wedgwood, DSO (28 March 1863 – 3 July 1916) was a British soldier and partner in the Wedgwood pottery firm. He was the first Mayor of Stoke-on-Trent.

== Life ==
Wedgwood was the only son of Godfrey Wedgwood and his first wife Mary Jane Jackson Hawkshaw, (daughter of the great civil engineer Sir John Hawkshaw, and the poet Ann Hawkshaw) who died shortly after he was born. He was the great-great-grandson of the potter Josiah Wedgwood.

Wedgwood became a partner in the firm in 1884 with his uncle Laurence Wedgwood and later his cousin Francis Hamilton Wedgwood. He married Lucie Gibson in 1888, and they had two daughters, one of whom married a brother of the Wedgwood pottery designer Daisy Makeig-Jones;

- Phoebe Sylvia Wedgwood (1893–1972) remained unmarried.
- Doris Audrey Wedgwood (1894–1968) married Thomas Geoffrey Rowland Makeig-Jones in 1928.

Wedgwood was commissioned a lieutenant in the part-time 4th (3rd King's Own Staffordshire Militia) Battalion, North Staffordshire Regiment in 1883. He was promoted to captain on 9 May 1887. The battalion was embodied after the outbreak of the Second Boer War in late 1899, and he left Queenstown for South Africa on the SS Kildonan Castle with other men of the battalion in March 1900. Promoted to major on 12 September 1900, he served as Station Commandant in South Africa. After the end of hostilities he returned home in June 1902, and resigned from his commission the following month. He was awarded the Distinguished Service Order (DSO) in the October 1902 South African Honours list for his services during the war.

He was the first Mayor of the Federated County Borough of Stoke-on-Trent in 1910 and 1911.

On the outbreak of World War I in 1914 he raised the 7th (Service) Battalion, North Staffordshire Regiment. He was killed at the La Boiselle during the Battle of the Somme in July 1916. His body was found and identified by James Leather, a 21-year-old bandsman and stretcher bearer. He is buried at the Bapaume Post Military Cemetery in Albert, Somme.

He was succeeded as chairman and managing director of Wedgwood by his cousin Francis Hamilton Wedgwood.
