= Godfrey Wedgwood =

- Born: 22 January 1833; Etruria Hall
- Died: 9 October 1905 (aged 72)
- Spouse(s): Mary Jane Jackson Hawkshaw; Hope Elizabeth Wedgwood
- Parent(s): Francis Wedgwood; Frances Mosley
- Family: Darwin–Wedgwood family

Godfrey Wedgwood (22 January 1833 – 9 October 1905) was a partner in the Wedgwood pottery firm from 1859 to 1891.

== Early life ==
Wedgwood was born in Etruria Hall, the son of Francis Wedgwood and his wife Frances Mosley. He was taken into partnership by his father in 1859, and was later joined by his younger brothers Clement and Laurence. He and his brothers were responsible for the reintroduction of bone china c. 1876 and the employment of the artists Thomas Allen and Emile Lessore.

In 1898, like his great-grandfather Josiah Wedgwood, he suffered the amputation of his right leg.

== Family ==
He married twice, first to Mary Jane Jackson Hawkshaw (c. 1836–1863) on 24 June 1862 at St. Peter Pimlico, Westminster, Middlesex with whom he had a son Cecil Wedgwood (1863–1916); but she died in 1863 due to complications of the birth of Cecil. And secondly on 14 October 1876 in Marylebone Register Office to his cousin Hope Elizabeth Wedgwood, daughter of Hensleigh Wedgwood. They leased Caverswall Castle in Staffordshire between 1878 and 1888. They had a daughter Mary Euphrasia Wedgwood (1880–1952). Godfrey Wedgwood died at Idlerocks and is buried All Saints Churchyard in Moddershall, Staffordshire.

A distant relative and namesake, Godfrey James 'Birch' Wedgwood (13 July 1937 – 17 February 2023) founded insurance brokerage Wedgwood Insurance in 1978 in St. John's, Newfoundland and Labrador, Canada.
