= Francis Wedgwood (1800–1888) =

English Potter

- Born: 14 September 1800; Tarrant Gunville, Dorset, England
- Died: 2 October 1888 (aged 87); Barlaston, Staffordshire
- Spouse: Frances Mosley
- Children: 7
- Parent(s): Josiah Wedgwood II; Elizabeth Allen
- Family: Darwin–Wedgwood family

Francis Wedgwood (25 November 1800 – 2 October 1888) a grandson of the English potter Josiah Wedgwood

== Life ==
Born in Tarrant Gunville, Dorset, Wedgwood was the son of the MP Josiah Wedgwood II. He became a partner in the Wedgwood firm in 1827 and was left in sole charge after the retirement of his father and elder brother Josiah Wedgwood III.

On 26 April 1832 in Rolleston on Dove, he married Frances Mosley, daughter of the Rev. John Peploe Mosley, rector of Rolleston. She was the granddaughter of the late Sir John Parker Mosley, 1st Baronet, and cousin to Sir Oswald Mosley, 2nd Baronet. Francis and Frances had seven children:

- Godfrey Wedgwood (1833–1905)
- Amy Wedgwood (1835–1910)
- Cicely Mary Wedgwood (1837–1917)
- Clement Francis Wedgwood (1840–1889)
- Laurence Wedgwood (1844–1913)
- Constance Rose Wedgwood (1846–1903)
- Mabel Frances Wedgwood (born and died 1852)

Economic difficulties in the 1840s led to Etruria Works and Etruria Hall being put up for sale, though only the hall was sold, because he had no inclination to live there, as the location had become compromised. He built a new house on a small estate at Barlaston, which, if less grand, was in a better situation.

He was joined in business by his eldest son Godfrey, and later by his younger sons Clement Francis Wedgwood and Laurence. Wedgwood retired from business in 1876 and died at Barlaston, Staffordshire in 1888.
