= Frog Service =

Dinner service by Wedgwood

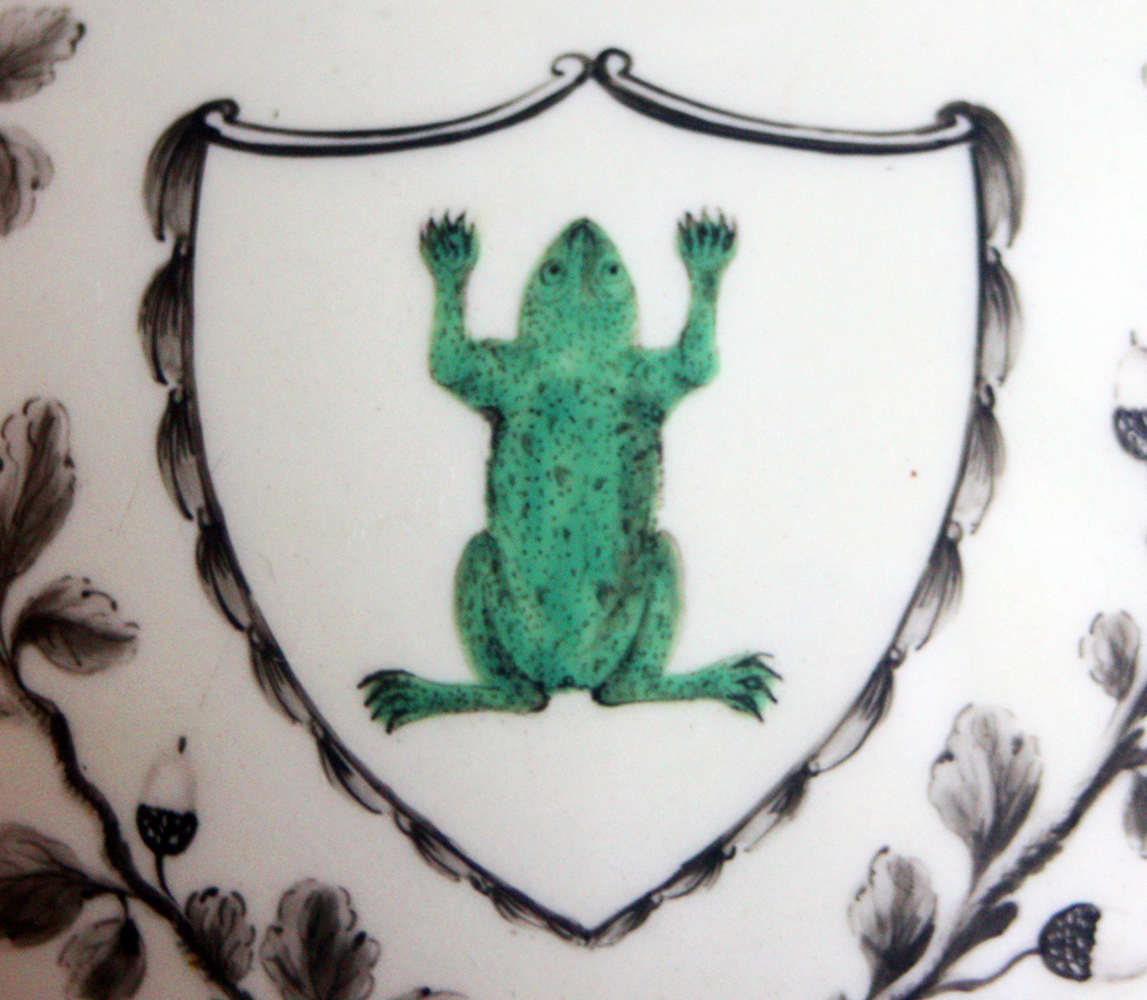
The green frog carried on every piece. According to Josiah Wedgwood's Victorian biographer "he was very unwilling to disfigure the service with this reptile [sic], but was told it was not to be dispensed with".

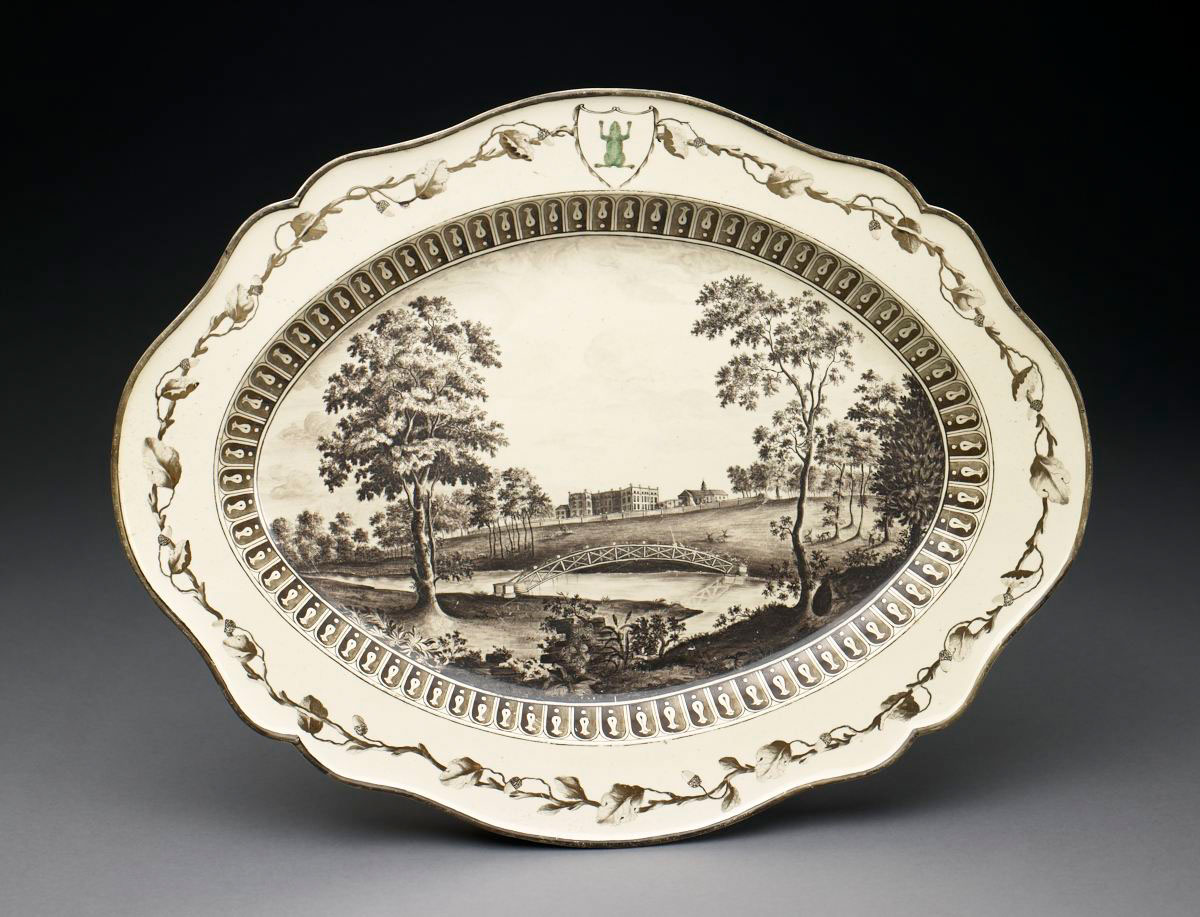
Serving-plate with Ditchley Park, Oxfordshire, Birmingham Museum of Art

The Frog Service or Green Frog Service is a large dinner and dessert service made by the English pottery company Wedgwood for Empress Catherine the Great of Russia, and completed in 1774. The service had fifty settings, and 944 pieces were ordered, 680 for the dinner service and 264 for the dessert. At Catherine's request the hand-painted decoration showed British scenes, copied from prints, with a total of 1,222 views. In addition each piece had a green frog within a shield, a reference to the name of the palace it was intended for.

Most unusually for a formal royal service, it was made from Wedgwood's "Queen's ware", the firm's type of creamware or fine earthenware. Normally, large services for royalty and the top nobility were in porcelain, like the Meissen Swan Service, and an imperial order for a large earthenware service was a great coup, representing a landmark in Staffordshire pottery's conquest of European markets.

The great majority of pieces are now in the State Hermitage Museum in St Petersburg, where many are on display.

== Background ==
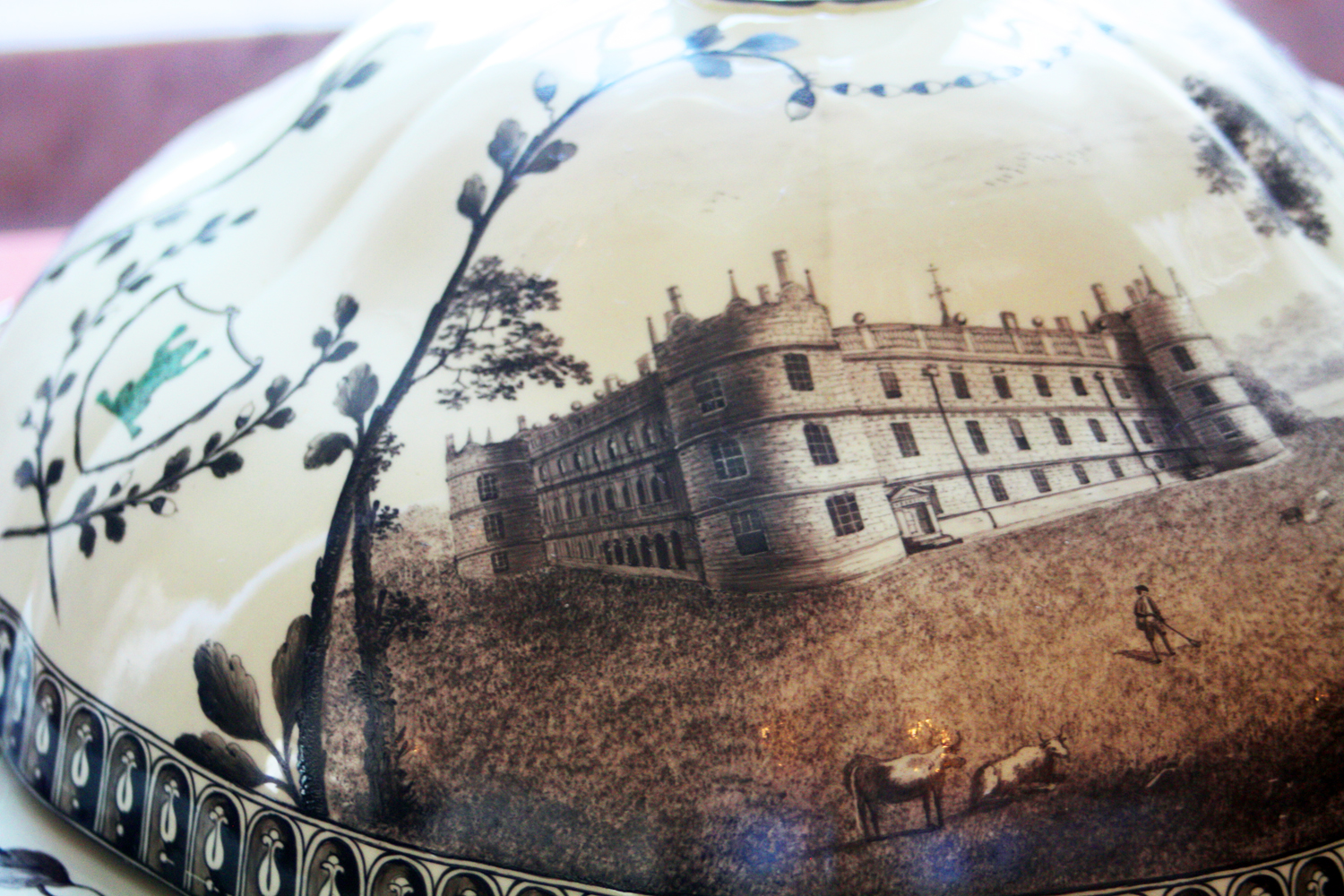
Detail of tureen with view of Longford Castle, Hermitage Museum

In 1770 the Imperial Russian Navy had a decisive victory over the Turks in the Battle of Chesma, part of the Russo-Turkish War (1768–1774) and the Orlov Revolt, a plan by Catherine to stir up Greece against its Ottoman rulers. The overall commander was Count Alexei Grigoryevich Orlov, brother of Catherine's lover Grigori; both brothers had been crucial in the coup against her husband that had brought her to the throne. Another brother was present at the battle.

Catherine decided to celebrate the victory by building the Chesme Palace. This was supposedly designed as a stopover to break the journey between St Petersburg and her summer palace at Tsarskoe Selo. Since the site chosen was only some five miles outside St Petersburg, it was perhaps not entirely necessary, even by Imperial standards, and once built was rather lightly used by the Imperial family, although it could be visited by others. The location was known as the "frog marsh" (Kekerekeksinsky), inspiring the frog device on the service. In the French-speaking court it was called La Grenouillère. The palace, or at least its unusual basic plan, was inspired by Longford Castle in Wiltshire, England. Both have a triangular main building with round towers at each corner. Longford was an Elizabethan prodigy house, but Catherine may have thought of it as Gothic architecture, in which she had a fashionable interest. Chesme Church, opposite the palace, is a startling pink Gothic Revival building, on a Russian plan, and the service depicts many Gothic buildings, including ruins. The sale of the service was made at the recommendation of Jean Cathcart who was the wife of the British ambassador, a friend to Catherine the Great and a patron to Josiah Wedgwood.

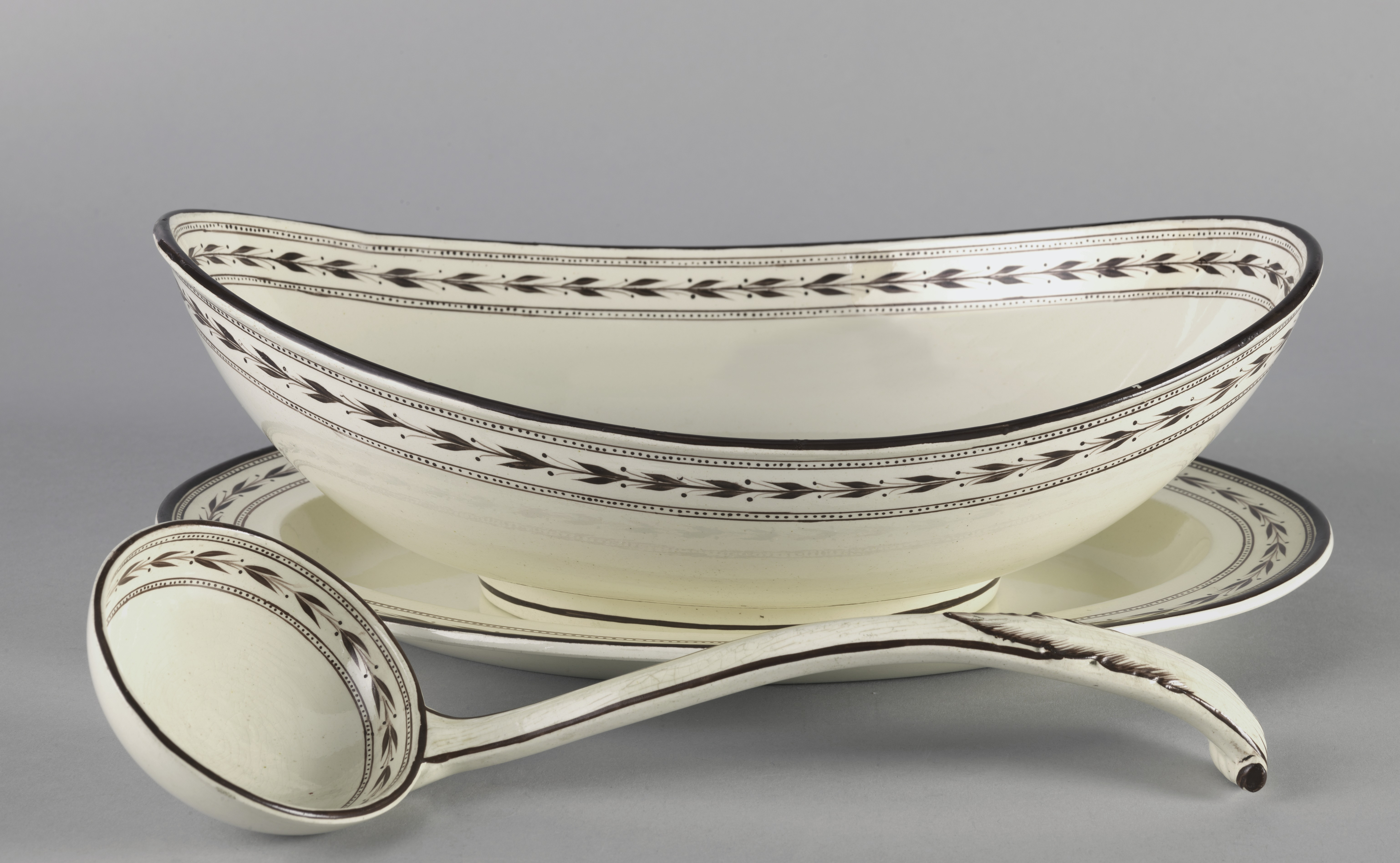
Dish, ladle and saucer with "husk" border, Wedgwood, c. 1780

The service was intended for use in the palace. Catherine was interested in Britain, and the role played in the battle by British naval officers such as John Elphinstone and Samuel Greig (made an admiral by Orlov during the action) may have added to the appropriateness of the chosen decoration. She had previously ordered a Wedgwood service, known as the "Husk Service", in 1770. This was also a combined dinner and dessert service in Queen's ware, but smaller, as it was for 24 settings. The painted decoration was also much simpler, with monochrome magenta-pink sprays of flowers in central zones, and borders of "pendant swags" of wheat husks, hence the name. This mostly remains in the Peterhof Palace; similar husk decoration was used on other pieces, including a service ordered by George Washington.

== Production and display ==
Catherine placed the new order in 1773 through Alexander Baxter, the Russian Consul in London. Views of England were requested, and the frogs. According to Llewellynn Jewitt, Josiah Wedgwood's Victorian biographer, "he was very unwilling to disfigure the service with this reptile [sic], but was told it was not to be dispensed with". Wedgwood's partner Thomas Bentley made the selection of views, mostly from illustrated books such as Samuel and Nathaniel Buck's Antiquities (1726–52), and the more recent Antiquities of England and Wales by Francis Grose, whose first volume was published in 1772. Other artists used were Thomas Smith of Derby, who had published engravings of his paintings of the Peak District (1760) and Lake District (1769), John Baptist Chatelain for views at Stowe House and around London, and Anthony Devis. In some cases Wedgwood commissioned paintings or drawings specially, or asked property-owners to lend theirs.

Some pieces had views of the industrial buildings that were appearing in the British landscape, and many showed gardens in the new English landscape garden style, which Catherine was very interested in, with 17 gardens by Capability Brown depicted in the service. It appears that the selection of views leaned towards properties owned by good customers of Wedgwood, who no doubt enjoyed the thought of the Russian court seeing their houses and gardens. Wedgwood's own house, Etruria Hall, was shown on a serving dish.

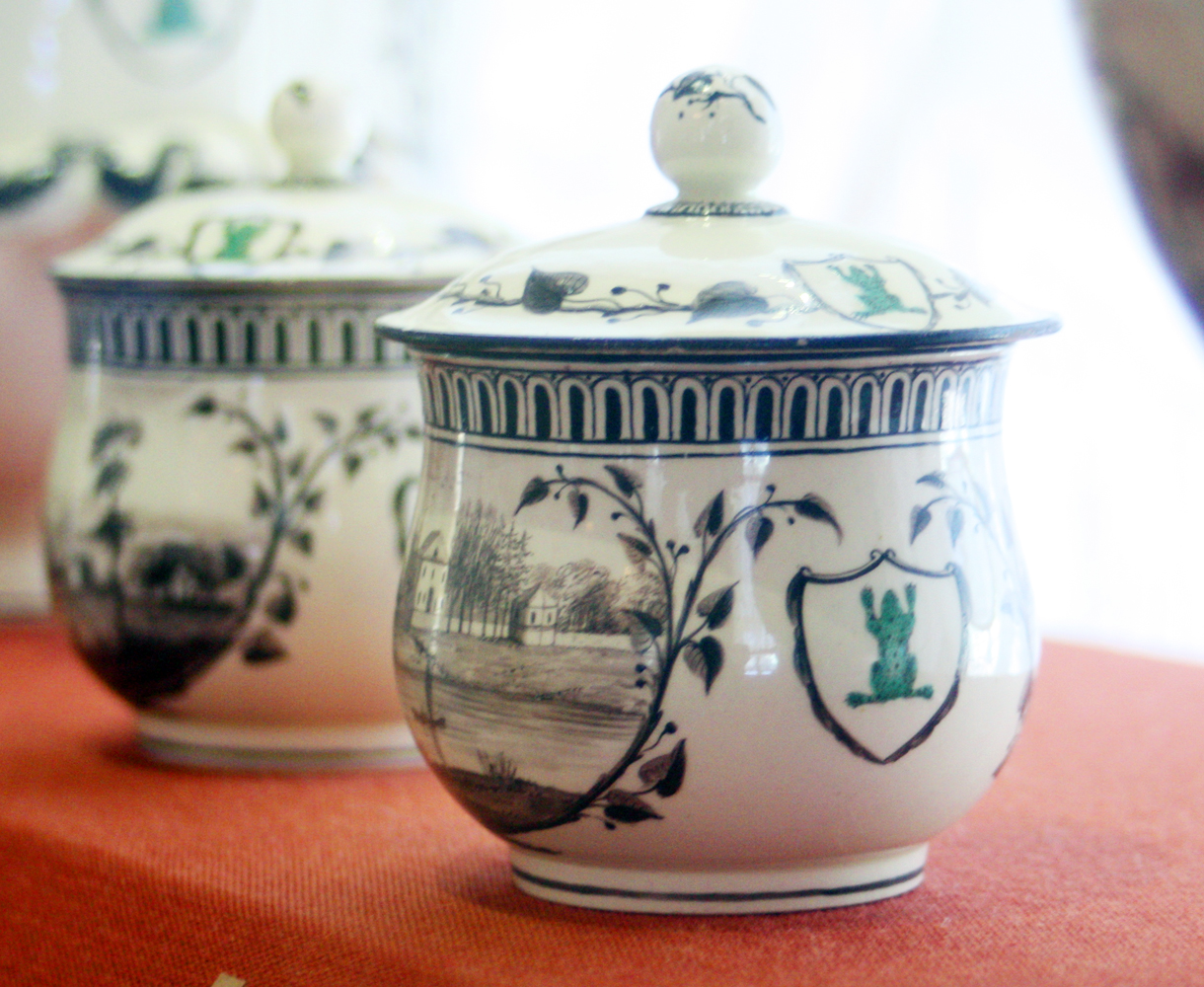
Jars with covers, with the dessert borders, Hermitage Museum

The rims were decorated with an egg-and-dart pattern, and the borders of open shapes in the dinner service with a pattern of a slightly scrolling stem bearing oak leaves and acorns. The edges of the dessert service had a similar border pattern, but only with heart-shaped ivy leaves. The edges of open shapes were slightly scalloped or "wavy". Apart from the green frog, the decoration was in a monochrome sepia.

The pottery bodies were made and glazed in Wedgwood's Etruria Works in Stoke-on-Trent, but then taken to London to be painted at Wedgwood's workshop in Little Cheyne Row in Chelsea, opened in 1769. They were then given a lighter second firing to fix the "enamel" overglaze decoration. Over 30 painters were employed for the service. Before shipping to Russia it was placed on display, with great publicity, in Wedgwood's showrooms in Portland House, 12 Greek Street, Soho, London, in June 1774. A small fee was charged. According to a letter by a visitor, there were five rooms "filled with it, laid out on tables". The pieces were numbered on the underside, the numbers matching a catalogue prepared for Catherine, and also published by the firm.

The price agreed was £2,290, which was low for such a large service with so much painting. Wedgwood's direct costs were £2,612, and in the end he received just over £2,700, (equivalent to £351,966 in 2025) a very meagre profit. But the reputational value to the firm was enormous. Some pieces were retained by Wedgwood for various reasons: trial pieces, some dessert pieces painted with the dinner border, some perhaps as the view was thought not sufficiently interesting.

== After delivery ==
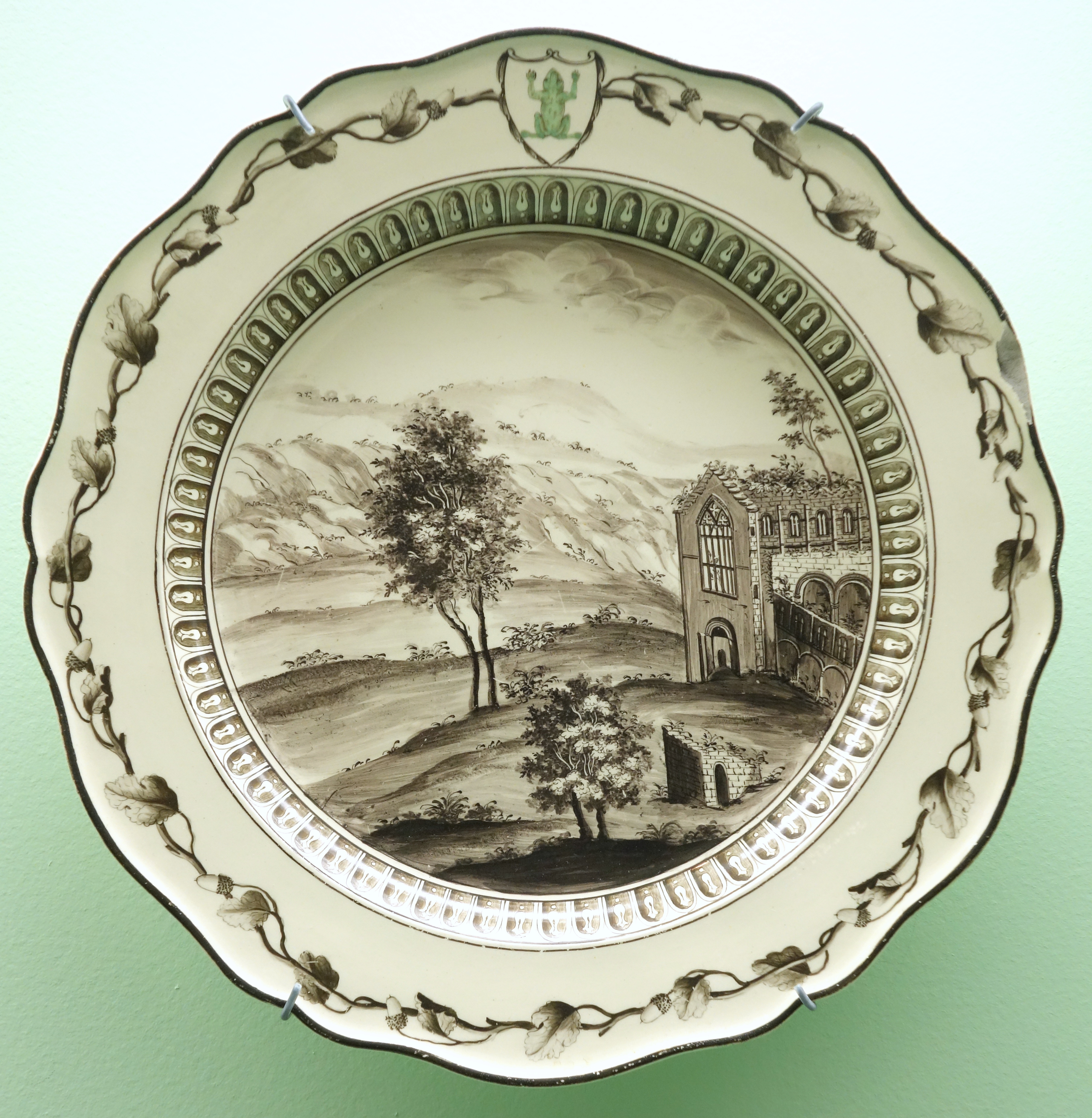
Plate with ruined monastery, Brooklyn Museum

The Chesme Palace was not completed until 1780, well after the service was delivered, and in fact seems to have been little used by Catherine, though Jewitt records that she showed the service to the British ambassador, James Harris, 1st Earl of Malmesbury, at the palace in 1795.

The service, though a marketing triumph, represented something of a dead end in terms of the development of English pottery, and the high-water mark of fine hand-painted earthenware. Wedgwood tried to keep together the large and skilled team of painters he had assembled for the job, but found that the prices he could achieve for pieces in even the finest earthenware were not enough to pay for complicated painted designs in the style of the service, as customers were not prepared to pay porcelain prices for them. A number of pieces with variations of the Frog Service pattern (but no frogs) were made around 1774, some with views painted in colour.

For normal commercial wares, the transfer printing method had already become the norm in English pottery for detailed monochrome decoration. This allowed a printed design to be repeated on large numbers of pieces, which could be supplemented by hand-painted colour where desired. This painting was mostly in broad washes, only requiring a relatively low level of skill, and the painters, mostly women, could be trained-up in the Staffordshire factories. Wedgwood was already producing transfer-printed wares in quantity, at this point sending them by canal to Liverpool for specialists to do the printing.

In the same years he was developing new bodies including his Jasperware, which by the following decade was extremely popular and much more efficient to produce. This normally used moulds and dye for a strong decorative effect, with no hand-painting needed. Wedgwood's catalogues first mention the Jasperware body, as yet uncoloured, in 1774.

Apart from the hundreds of pieces in the Hermitage Museum, there are at least five pieces in the Wedgwood Museum and a scattering of others elsewhere. Recent auction prices include $US 46,000 for a serving plate in 2009, and £14,000 (2001) and £17,000 (2004) for dessert plates. In 1995 Wedgwood began to produce limited edition reproductions of the service. The same year a monograph and full catalogue on the service was published in London.

Over 300 pieces from the Hermitage, plus many from other collections, were included in an exhibition in 1995 at the Victoria and Albert Museum in London.

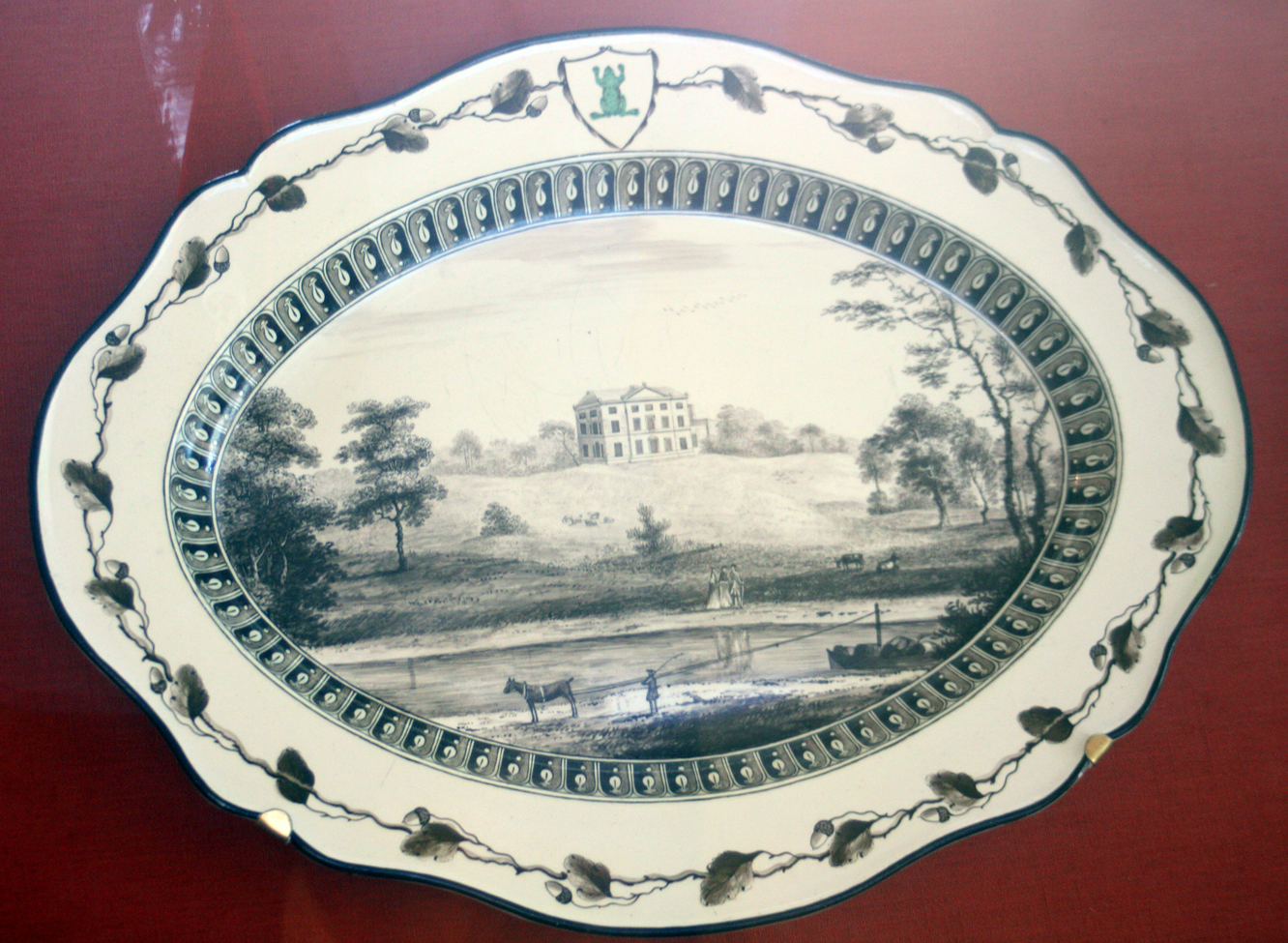
Serving-plate showing Josiah Wedgwood's own Etruria Hall, Hermitage Museum.

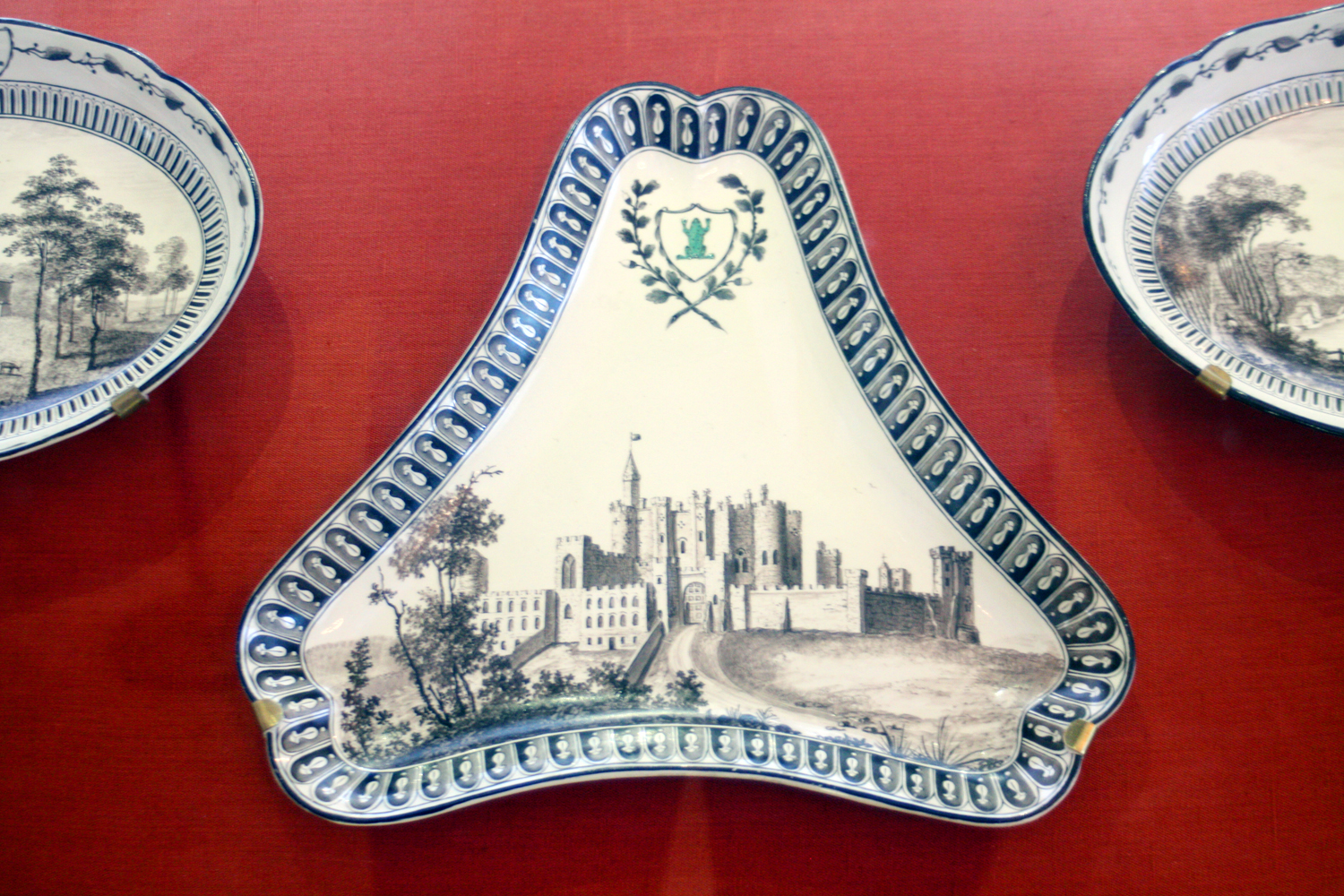
Tray with Alnwick Castle, Hermitage Museum

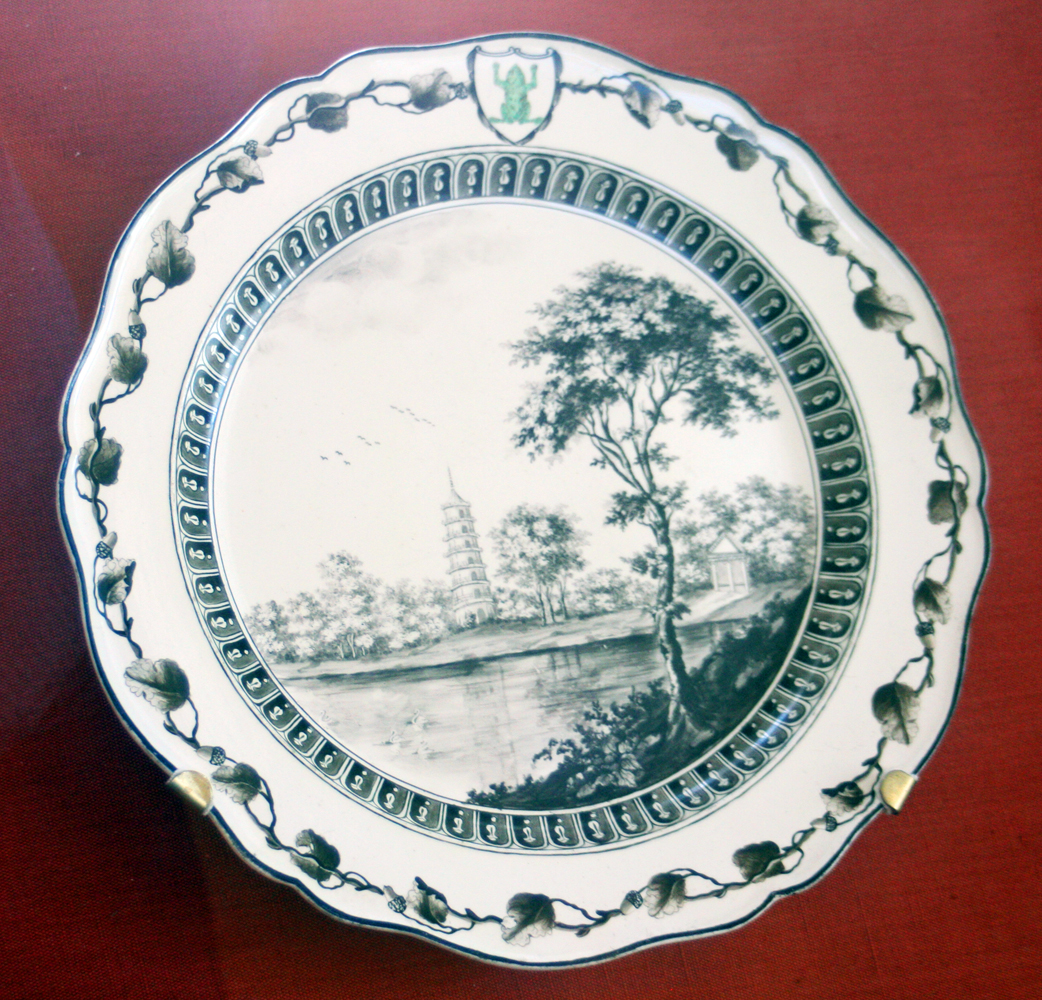
Plate with the Great Pagoda, Kew Gardens, only erected in 1761

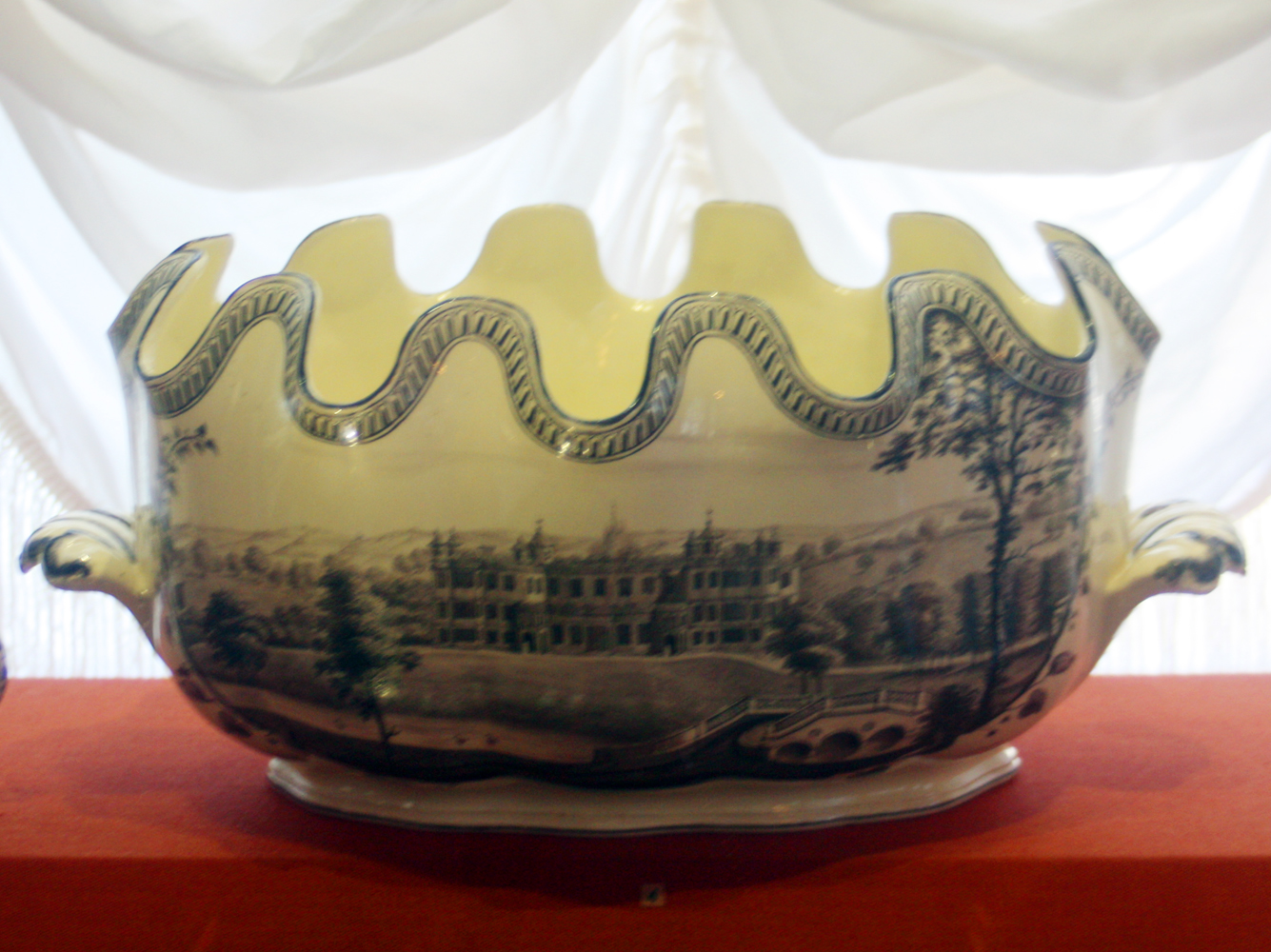
Glass-cooler with Audley End

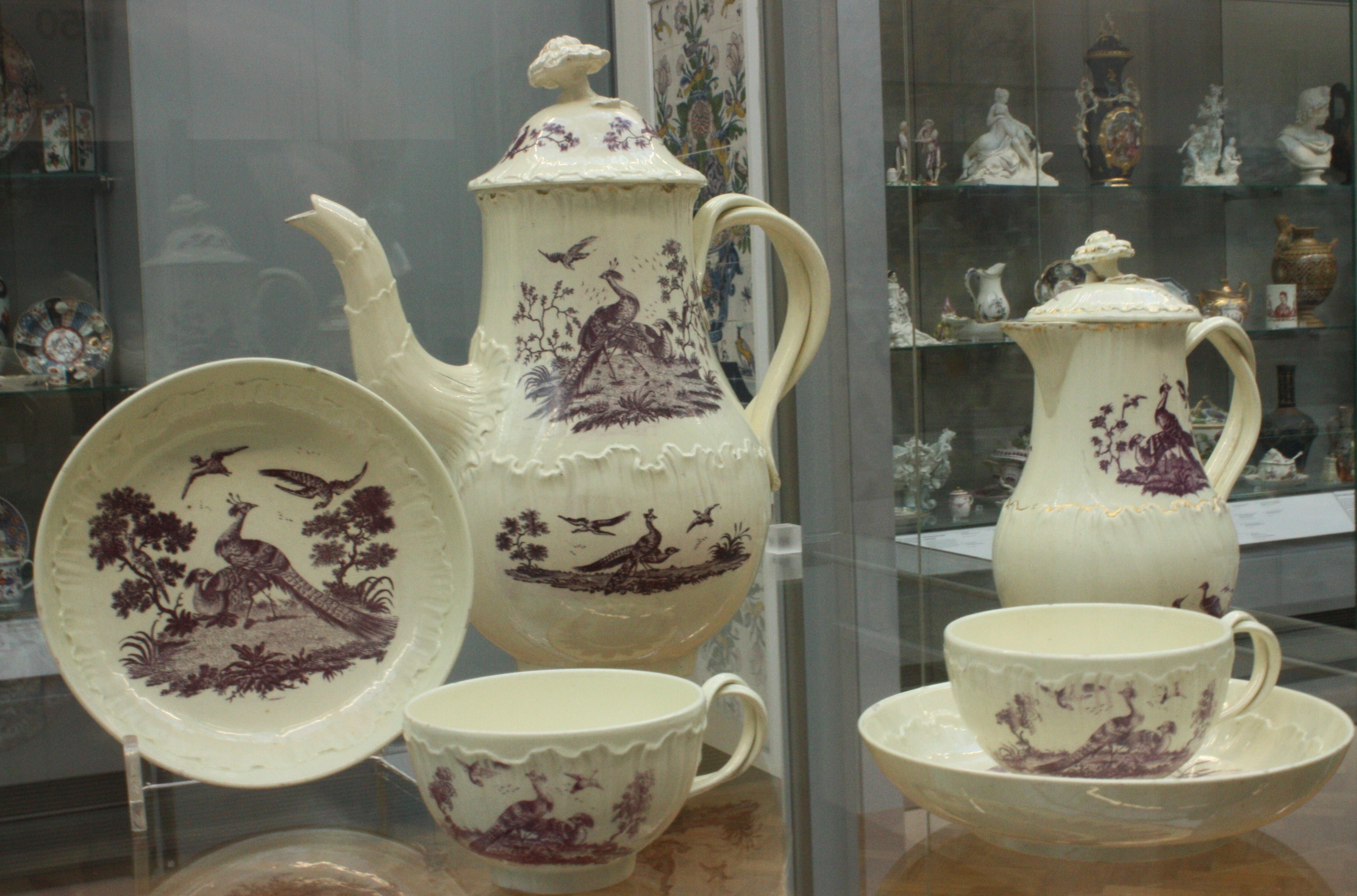
Transfer printed Wedgwood Queen's ware coffee service, c. 1775

== See also ==
- Frogs in culture
