= Laurence Wedgwood =

- Born: 1844
- Died: 5 May 1913
- Spouse: Emma Elizabeth Houseman (m. 1871)
- Children: 6
- Parent(s): Francis Wedgwood; Frances Mosley
- Family: Darwin–Wedgwood family

Laurence Wedgwood (1844 – 5 May 1913) was a director of the Wedgwood pottery firm.

== Family ==
Wedgwood was the youngest son of Francis Wedgwood and his wife, Frances Mosley. Wedgwood helped incorporate Josiah Wedgwood & Sons Ltd. in 1895. Elder brothers Godfrey and Clement were also in the business. He was the great-grandson of the potter Josiah Wedgwood. He married Emma Elizabeth Houseman on 18 April 1871 and they had six children:

- Kennard Laurence Wedgwood (1873–1949), partner in Wedgwood & sons.
- Mary Frances "Molly" Wedgwood (1874–1969)
- Gilbert Henry Wedgwood (1876–1963), an officer in the York and Lancaster Regiment
- Clement John Wedgwood (1877–1954)
- Geoffrey Walter Wedgwood (1879–1897)
- Unnamed daughter (born and died 22 October 1882)
