= Etruria, Staffordshire =

Suburb of Stoke-on-Trent, Staffordshire, England

Coordinates: 53.0189°N 2.1994°W

Etruria
- Location within Staffordshire
- OS grid reference: SJ867468
- Unitary authority: Stoke-on-Trent
- Ceremonial county: Staffordshire
- Region: West Midlands
- Country: England
- Sovereign state: United Kingdom
- Post town: STOKE-ON-TRENT
- Postcode district: ST1
- Dialling code: 01782
- Police: Staffordshire
- Fire: Staffordshire
- Ambulance: West Midlands
- UK Parliament: Stoke-on-Trent Central

Etruria is a suburb of Stoke-on-Trent, Staffordshire, England.

== History ==
=== Home of Wedgwood ===
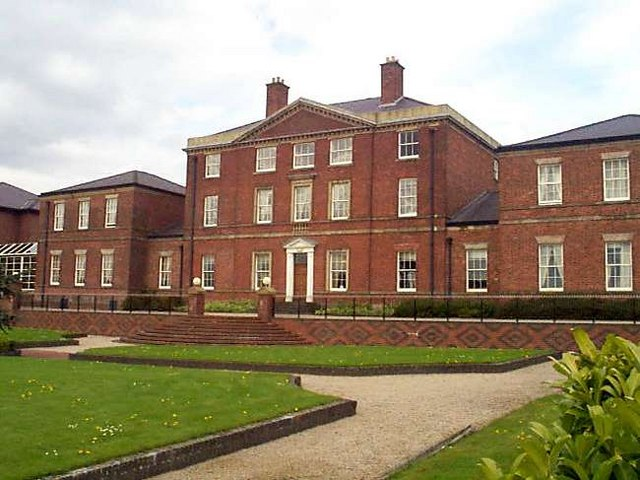
Etruria Hall, the Wedgwood family home

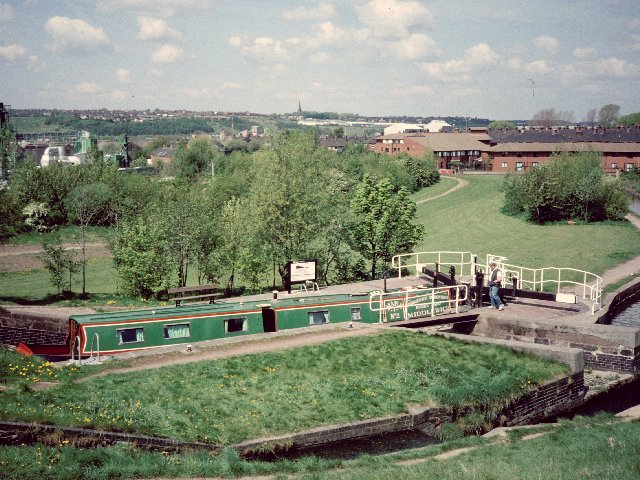
Canal scene at Etruria

Etruria was the fourth and penultimate site for the Wedgwood pottery business. Josiah Wedgwood, who was previously based in Burslem, opened his new works in 1769. It was named after the Italian district of Etruria, home of the Etruscan people who were renowned for their artistic products. The site covered 350 acres (140 ha) and was next to the Trent and Mersey Canal. As well as Wedgwood's home, Etruria Hall, it included the Etruria Works which remained in use by the Wedgwood enterprise until 1950. The Wedgwood factory is now in Barlaston, a village about six miles to the south of the Etruria site.

Etruria Hall was the site of the substantial invention of photography by Thomas Wedgwood in the 1790s.

=== After Wedgwood ===
Much of Etruria became derelict with the move of Wedgwood after the Second World War and the subsequent closure of the nearby Shelton Bar steelworks. Large-scale regeneration began in the 1980s with the Stoke-on-Trent Garden Festival. Since the Festival closed at the end of 1986, the site has been given over to the Festival Park commercial and retail development. Etruria was also formerly home to The Sentinel, the local evening newspaper for the Stoke-on-Trent area. The press hall there was responsible for printing several newspaper titles, including The Sentinel, and many northern editions of The Daily Mail. The Sentinel had previously been based in Hanley, and upon the site's closure it moved back. The site was bought by Bet365 and demolished to make way for new offices.

Etruria was served by a railway station which was opened by the North Staffordshire Railway on 9 October 1848, but it was closed on 30 September 2005. In the late 19th and early 20th centuries, Etruria Railway Station was used as a base for Buffalo Bill and his Wild West Show. His reason was, that as it was in the Midlands, it was central to the whole country (and possibly a cheaper rent or lease for the sidings) and it was thus easier to get around the whole country than travelling completely from the south to the north and vice versa. Many of the performers in his show were often seen around the locality of May Bank and Wolstanton in their Native Indian attire, as it was the only clothes that they owned. There is local folklore which states that an elephant used in the show, died and is buried in the vicinity of the railway station.

Etruria is home to the Etruria Industrial Museum, a scheduled ancient monument, which includes a working steam engine called Princess. The museum buildings were originally a bone and flint mill built in 1857 to grind materials for the pottery industry. Inside visitors can see displays on the history of the site and original machinery. On the first weekend of each month the museum's 1903 coal-fired boiler provides steam to operate Princess which then turns the grinding machinery.

== Current status ==
Etruria Canals Festival takes place annually at Etruria Industrial Museum on the first weekend in June.

Etruria remains connected by public transport. First Potteries operates bus routes 4 and 4A along Forge Lane and Festival Way between Hanley and Newcastle-under-Lyme; the 4 continues to Crackley while the 4A continues to Talke Pits.
