= Bapaume Post Military Cemetery =

WWI CWGC cemetery in Somme, France

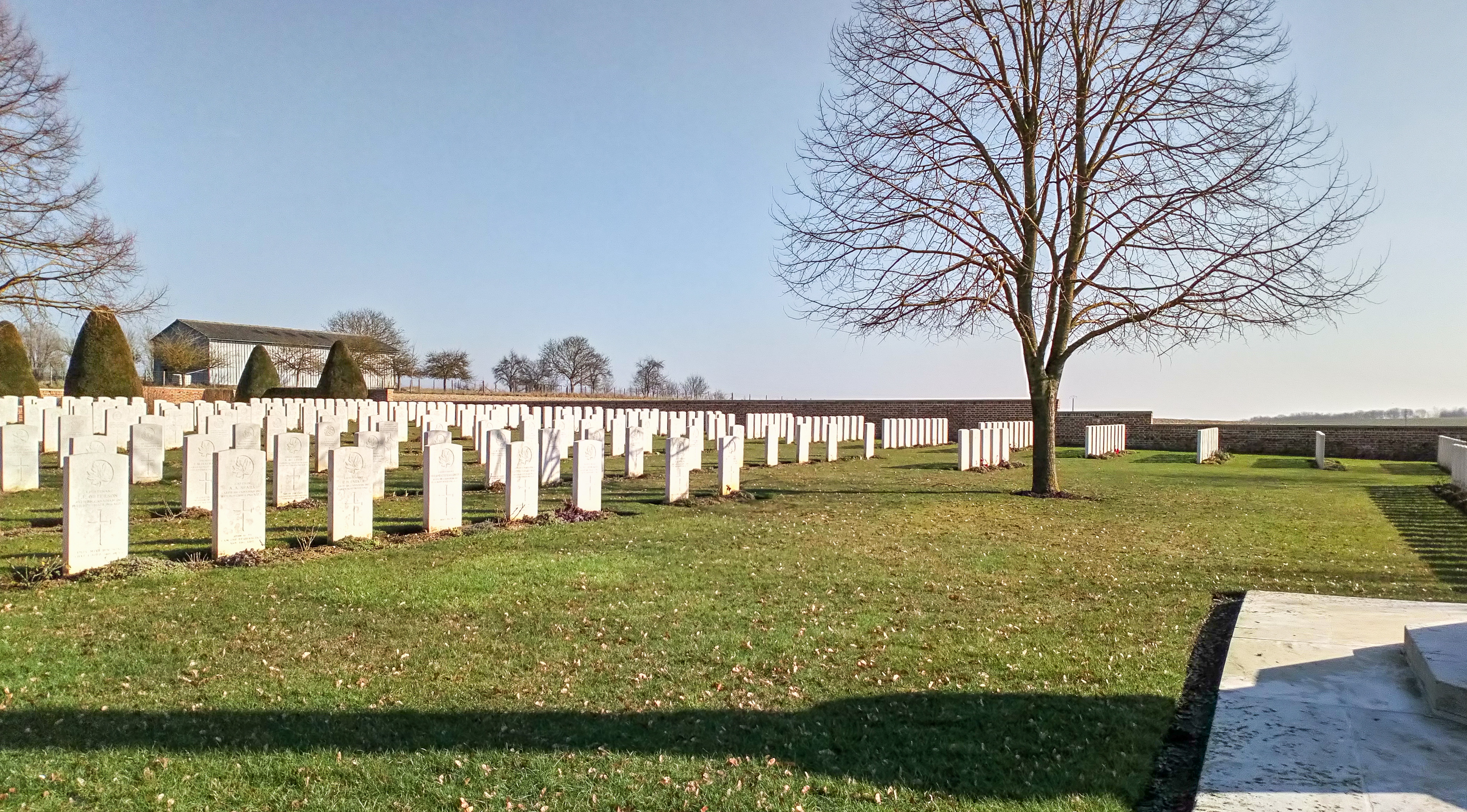
- The cemetery viewed from its westernmost corner

Details
- Established: July 1916
- Location: Albert, Somme, France
- Country: British and Commonwealth
- Coordinates: 50°00′42″N 2°40′26″E
- Type: Military
- No. of graves: 410 total, 229 identified
- Website: cwgc.org
- Find a Grave: Bapaume Post Military Cemetery

The Bapaume Post Military Cemetery (French: Cimetière militaire de Bapaume Post, Albert) is a cemetery located in the Somme region of France commemorating British and Commonwealth soldiers who fought in the Battle of the Somme in World War I. The cemetery is also known colloquially as the Tara Hill Cemetery and the Usna Hill Cemetery.

The cemetery honors mainly those who were killed in the 1 July 1916 attack on the village of La Boiselle, those who died defending the line in the areas east and west of the cemetery, and those who died retaking the village and the surrounding area in August 1918.

== Location ==
The cemetery is located on the southeastern side of the D929 road between the town of Albert and the village of La Boiselle. It is located west of Tara Hill and southwest of Usna Hill.

== Fighting around La Boiselle ==
The front line first crossed the area of the cemetery in June 1916. On 1 July 1916, the British 34th Tyneside Division, supported by various other units, mounted an unsuccessful attack on La Boiselle by marching up the upward sloped D929. They captured the village on 4 July after further attacks. On 26 March 1918, the village and the town of Albert were taken again by the Germans, but were recaptured in August of the same year. The 36th Welsh Division captured the nearby Usna Hill on 23 August.

== Establishment ==
=== History ===
The cemetery was begun in July 1916 by the divisions manning the local line. 152 graves were dug in Plot I, rows B through I, by the end of January 1917. After the end of the war, graves from nearby battlefields, including those of the 34th and 36th divisions, were reburied in the cemetery. The cemetery was designed by Charles Holden and William Harrison Cowlishaw.

=== Layout ===
The Bapaume Post Cemetery is rectangular in shape and is split into Plots I, II, and III. A Cross of Sacrifice is located in the lower left hand corner, to the left of Plot III and in front of Plot I.

=== Statistics ===
A total of 410 casualties are buried in the cemetery, of which 181 are unidentified and 229 are identified. Special memorials are dedicated to three soldiers believed to be buried among the unknown.

Identified Burials by Nationality
Nationality	Number of Burials
United Kingdom	146
Canada	64
Australia	18
South Africa	1

Number of Burials by Unit
Canadian Burials	64	Northumberland Fusiliers	26
Australian Burials	18	Royal Field Artillery	14
Royal Welsh Fusiliers	12	Royal Warwickshire Regiment	11
Royal Engineers	5	South Lancashire Regiment	5
The Queens	4	Royal Scots	4
Suffolk Regiment	4	Gloucestershire Regiment	3
Lincolnshire Regiment	3	Machine Gun Corps	3
North Staffordshire Regiment	3	Rifle Brigade	3
Royal Berkshire Regiment	3	Royal Sussex Regiment	3
South Wales Borderers	3	Worcestershire Regiment	3
Royal Army Medical Corps	3	Royal Garrison Artillery	3
East Lancashire Regiment	2	Essex Regiment	2
Norfolk Regiment	2	Northamptonshire Regiment	2
Royal Fusiliers (City of London)	2	South Staffordshire Regiment	2
Buffs	1	East Yorkshire Regiment	1
King's Own (Royal Lancaster Regiment)	1	King's Royal Rifle Corps	1
9th Btn London Regiment. Queen Victoria Rifles	1	Loyal North Lancashire Regiment	1
Manchester Regiment	1	Royal Irish Rifles	1
Welsh Regiment	1	Wiltshire Regiment	1
South African Burials	1		
