= Etruria Hall =

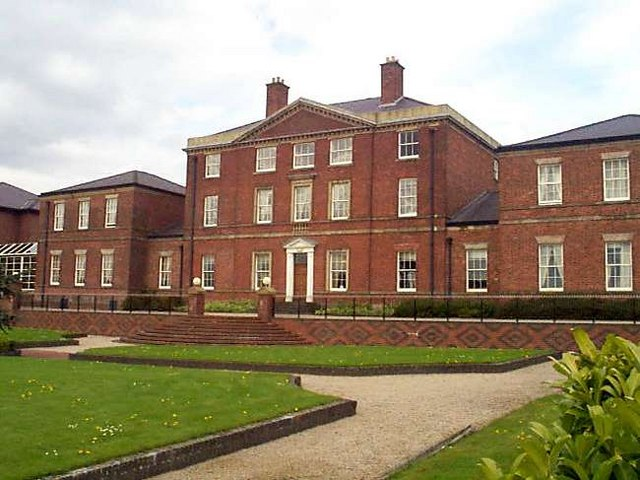
- Interactive map of the Etruria Hall area

General information
- Architectural style: Neo-classical
- Location: Stoke-on-Trent, Staffordshire, United Kingdom
- Coordinates: 53°1′33.96″N 2°11′43.08″W
- Construction started: 1768
- Completed: 1771
- Client: Josiah Wedgwood

Etruria Hall in Etruria, Stoke-on-Trent, Staffordshire, England is a Grade II listed house and former home of the potter Josiah Wedgwood. It was built between 1768–1771 by Joseph Pickford. The hall was sold by the Wedgwoods in the 19th century and is now part of a hotel.

== History ==
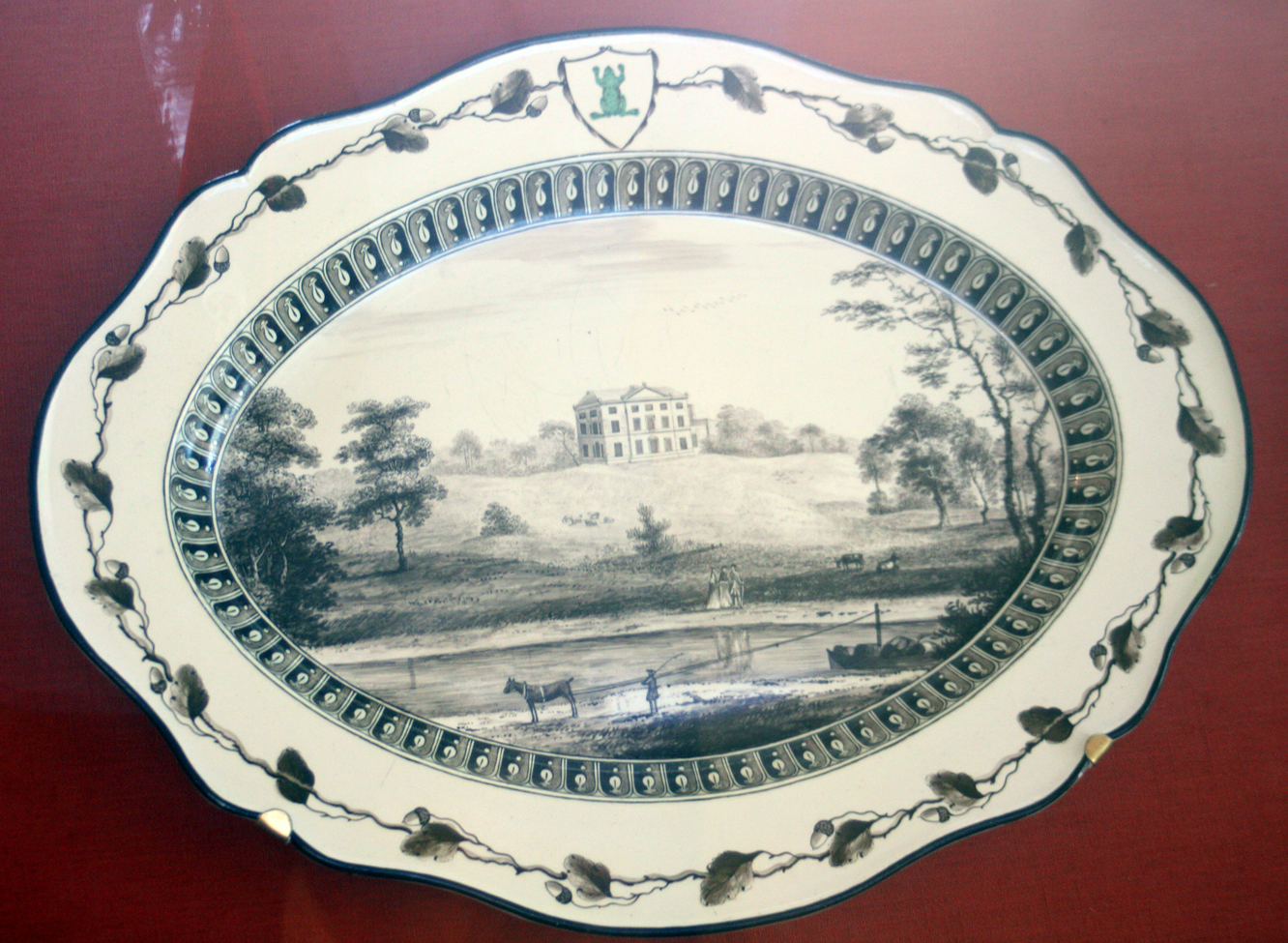
Serving-plate from Wedgwood's Frog Service for Catherine the Great, 1774, showing the hall

=== The Wedgwoods ===
Etruria Hall was built between 1768-1771 by Joseph Pickford, for Josiah Wedgwood, near his new recently built, Etruria works. The majority of the 'ceilings, ornamental friezes and chimney pieces' were designed by John Flaxman between 1781-1787. An entry in the 1784-1785 Wedgwood company ledger indicates that at least one of the ceilings was designed by William Blake, although it cannot be certain that this design was ever implemented.

The hall was the site of the innovative research into photography by Thomas Wedgwood in the 1790s. There is a small commemorative plaque on the Hall. Due to financial difficulties Etruria Hall was sold in the 1840s by Francis Wedgwood, who moved to the smaller Barlaston Hall nearby.

=== Recent history ===
The building was given Grade II listed status in 1973. The house was restored as part of the 1986 Stoke-on-Trent Garden Festival, the second of Britain's national garden festivals, and incorporated as the centre-piece of the festival to lend it a 'historical dimension'. After the end of the festival, the hall was one of the few buildings on the site allowed to remain. It was developed as part of the four-star Stoke on Trent Moat House, later becoming a member of the Best Western chain of independent hotels. The hotel's meeting and events centre and the rooms were named after Josiah's business colleagues and friends including the Prince of Wales and Earl Granville. The walls of the hall are lined with prints of the Wedgwood family and Wedgwood pottery. The cellars beneath Etruria Hall were where Josiah Wedgwood performed some of his work developing new pottery bodies. In 2020, the hotel was taken over by the Hilton group and now forms one of their DoubleTree chain.

== Architecture and design ==
The hall consists of a central block of three storeys flanked by two pavilions, both of two storeys. The building is built in the neo-classical style, with the central block featuring a large pediment. The majority of the work is in brick, with stone dressings. There is some evidence that the upper floor may have been rebuilt during extensive 19th century remodelling.
