= Clement Wedgwood =

English businessman

- Born: 25 February 1840
- Died: 24 January 1889 (aged 48)
- Spouse: Emily Catherine Rendel
- Children: 5, including Francis Hamilton Wedgwood, Josiah Wedgwood IV
- Parent(s): Francis Wedgwood; Frances Mosley
- Family: Darwin–Wedgwood family

Clement Francis Wedgwood (25 February 1840 – 24 January 1889) was an English businessman, a partner in the Wedgwood pottery firm. The son of Francis Wedgwood and his wife Frances Mosley. He was a great-grandson of the potter Josiah Wedgwood.

== Family ==
He married Emily Catherine Rendel, daughter of the engineer James Meadows Rendel, on 6 November 1866, and they had five sons, one of whom died in infancy:

- Francis Hamilton Wedgwood, JP, High Sheriff, (1867–1930)
- Clement Henry Wedgwood (1870–1871) died in infancy
- Josiah Clement Wedgwood, 1st Baron Wedgwood (1872–1943)
- Sir Ralph Wedgwood, 1st Baronet (1874–1956) 1st baronet, chief officer of the LNER for 16 years.
- Arthur Felix Wedgwood (1877–1917), killed during the First World War
