= Minton Archive =

The Minton Archive is a collection of records for the English pottery firm Minton. The archive was originally housed in the firm's works at London Road, Stoke-on-Trent. It was catalogued by Alyn Giles Jones (1928-2000), Archivist and Keeper of Manuscripts at the University of Wales, Bangor, who acted as archival consultant for the Minton china company.

The archive includes work by designers who were employed by Minton, including Augustus Pugin and Christopher Dresser.

The future of the archive was put at risk when, as a result of the contraction of the Staffordshire pottery industry, the Minton factory was demolished in 2002. Ownership of the archive passed to Waterford Wedgwood plc which decided to auction it. Money was raised by the Art Fund and the archive was presented to the City of Stoke-on-Trent in 2015. The archive is kept in Hanley, where the documents are being digitised by the city's archive service (part of the Staffordshire and Stoke on Trent Archive Service). It is envisaged that some material will go on display at the Potteries Museum & Art Gallery and the Wedgwood Museum, Barlaston.
