= Elmore Nickleberry =

1968 Memphis sanitation striker

Elmore Egion Nickleberry
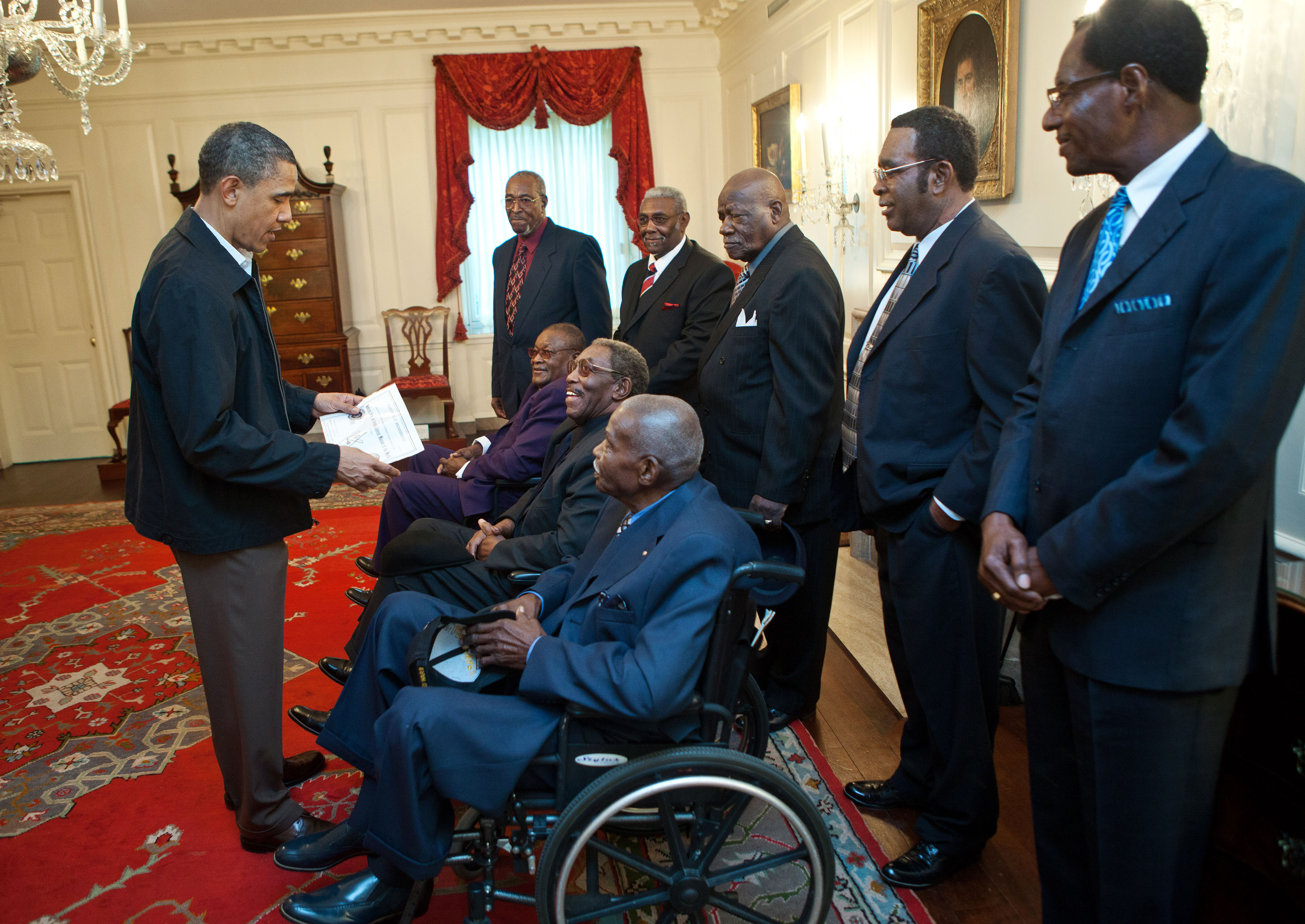
- Born: December 15, 1931; Memphis, Tennessee, US
- Died: December 30, 2023 (aged 92); Memphis, Tennessee, US
- Children: 6

Elmore Egion Nickleberry (December 15, 1931 – December 30, 2023) was an American sanitation worker and civil rights activist who went on strike after Echol Cole and Robert Walker were killed in a truck malfunction accident. He marched alongside the reverend Dr. Martin Luther King Jr. until he was assassinated on April 4, 1968; the day after Dr. King made the speech “I’ve Been To The Mountaintop”.

== Early life ==
He was born on December 15, 1931, to Emma and Earl Nickleberry. One of his grandfathers was enslaved. In sixth grade he dropped out of school and joined his father once in a while to pick cotton.

== Military career ==
He was a veteran of the Eighth Army Armored Division during the Korean War, serving as a corporal. At the age of 22, in 1953, he returned home and got a job working for the city of Memphis. He claimed that the military treated him better than the city's sanitation department due to Jim Crow's laws being in effect at that time.

== Career with the City of Memphis ==
Nickleberry started to work for the city of Memphis, Tennessee's sanitation department after military service, but there was job scarcity for African Americans in the South due to segregation. He was paid very little. Homeowners called him "garbage man" and hated it because he thought he himself was garbage. He participated in the 1968 Memphis Sanitation Strike, for which he was well known for, and worked for the city of Memphis for over 60 years. His motive for the longevity of his career was because the 1968 settlement did not leave them with pension benefits. He retired after the 14 surviving members (at the time) received a $50,000 (USD) settlement for retirement.

== Personal life and death ==
Nickleberry had six children, five of which are living. Tondalaya was murdered in 1999 after a man who she thought was a friend stabbed her several times and strangled her.

Terence said Elmore got cancer again, and was admitted to the hospital around Thanksgiving Day, with fluid in his lungs.

He died on December 30, 2023 from heart problems at around 2:00 AM.
