= Wedgwood anti-slavery medallion =

18th century abolitionist symbol

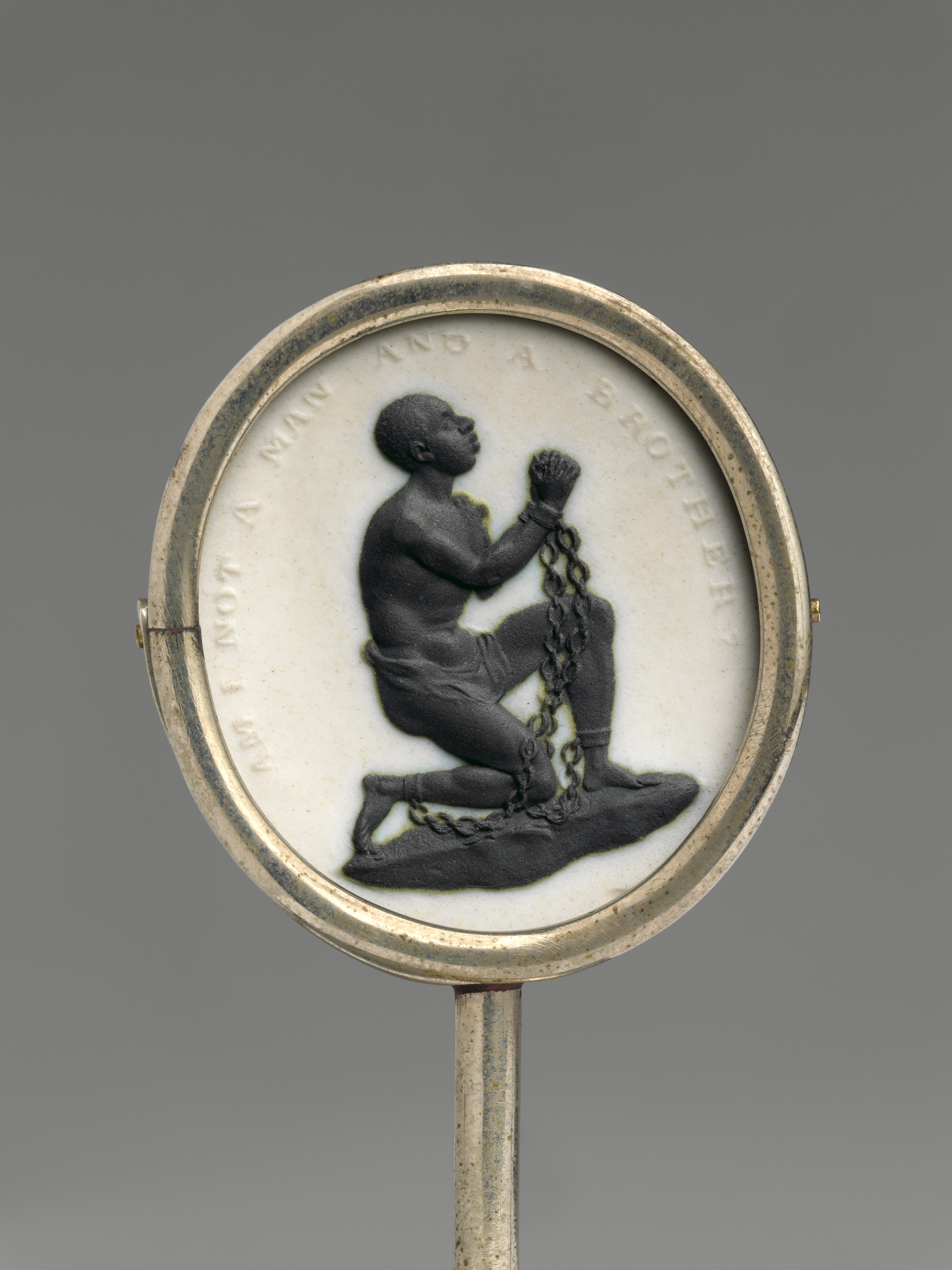
A Wedgwood anti-slavery medallion in the collection of the Metropolitan Museum of Art

The Wedgwood anti-slavery medallion was an abolitionist symbol produced and distributed by British potter and entrepreneur Josiah Wedgwood in 1787 as a seal for the Society for the Abolition of the Slave Trade. The medallion depicts a kneeling black man in chains with his hands raised to the heavens; it is inscribed with the phrase "Am I not a man and a brother?"

The figure was likely designed and modelled by Henry Webber and William Hackwood with Wedgwood's involvement. The medallion was produced as a jasperware cameo at Wedgwood's Etruria Works factory, and was widely distributed in Britain and the United States. These cameos were worn as pendants, inlaid in snuff boxes, and used to adorn bracelets and hair pins, rapidly becoming fashionable symbols of the British abolition movement. The medallion helped to further the abolitionist cause and is today accepted as "the most recognizable piece of antislavery paraphernalia the movement ever produced."

== Origin ==
On July 5, 1787, the Society for Effecting the Abolition of the Slave Trade resolved to develop a recognizable seal for their cause and charged founder Joseph Hooper with the commission. Hooper solicited the help of prominent British potter and entrepreneur Josiah Wedgwood. On October 16, 1787 a design by Henry Webber was presented to a committee of the Society. According to Mary Guyatt, and "it is fair to suggest that [Wedgwood] would have had some influence over the eventual design" given his personal involvement in the project. Webber's design depicted a black male slave in a kneeling posture accompanied by the motto "Am I not a man and a brother?" The motif was adapted from a print design into sculpture, likely by William Hackwood.

=== Interpretation ===
The enslaved man's kneeling position and raised hands are often understood as a reference to supplication, marking him as a Christian appealing to Heaven. Accompanied by an English plea, the depicted man communicates that he is a Westernized figure who shares both a language and faith with a white British or American audience.

Contemporary interpretations of the medallion emphasize that while the design recognizes the commonality of enslaved people, it simultaneously consigns them to a place of weakness and deference to white society. Mary Guyatt writes,

Not only is the slave depicted in a weak posture, supplicating on bended knees and emasculated by his chains, but it is implicit that his appeal is addressed to white society as well as to Heaven. And since supplication demands that a hierarchy of power is established, the slave is clearly the submissive party, a non-threatening object whose purpose is to arouse pity in the hearts of potential converts to the abolitionists' cause. Indeed, Wedgwood, when suggesting that a woodcut of the same slave be used to introduce a Society pamphlet, described him as a "pathetic figure" which would "increase its effect somewhat."

== Distribution ==
By the end of 1787, Wedgwood began work to produce the design in cameo form at his pottery factory in Etruria, Staffordshire. The quantity of medallions produced and number of variants of the symbol manufactured is not known. According to Mary Guyatt, "basing our figures on the level of demand indicated by the 15,050 copies of Clarkson's pamphlet, A Summary View of the Slave Trade, distributed to supporters in the Society's first fifteen months, it can be presumed that demand for the medallion was of a comparable scale."

The medallions were likely distributed through the network of the Society for the Abolition of the Slave Trade. Wedgwood sent parcels of cameos to Thomas Clarkson as well as to Benjamin Franklin in the United States. Historians generally accept that Wedgwood himself financed the cost of production and distribution; cameos of a similar size were commercially sold for three guineas each (£3/-3, equivalent to £428 in 2025).

Wedgwood's anti-slavery cameos were eventually used to adorn a variety of items including snuff boxes, shoe buckles, bracelets, and hair pins which were commercially available in Britain and the United States. These items were purchased by hundreds of movement supporters—many of them middle-class women—who contributed to the increasing fashionability of the abolition movement.

== Influence ==
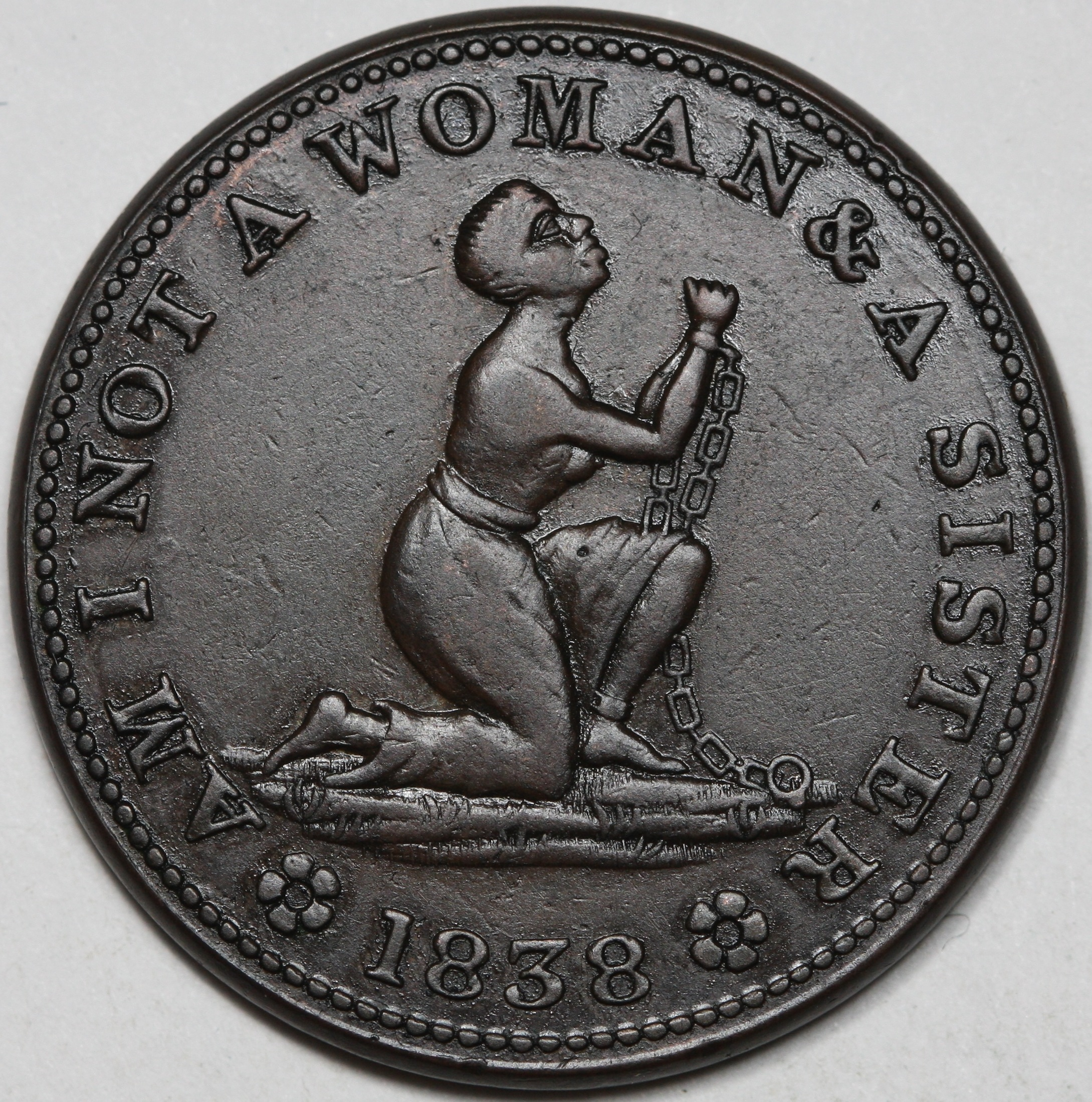
A copper coin produced by the American Anti-Slavery Society with a variation of the design featuring a woman

In 1828, a modified version of the medallion appeared featuring a kneeling woman slave and the phrase "Am I not a woman and a sister." This version was intended to specifically bring attention to the plight of enslaved women. George Bourne's 1837 Slavery Illustrated in Its Effects upon Woman and Domestic Society features the female variation of the symbol on its frontispiece.

The American abolitionist newspaper The Liberator featured the kneeling slave figure in its nameplate, likely designed by Hammatt Billings.

British suffragists adopted the medallion as one of the four quadrants of the Skelmanthorpe Flag, created to commemorate the victims of the Peterloo Massacre.

African American men participating in the 1968 Memphis sanitation strike carried posters reading "I AM A MAN"—a slogan that has often been traced to the Wedgwood medallion. As Cecelia M. Hartsell writes, "Am I Not a Man and a Brother" was no longer a question, as it had been in the eighteenth and nineteenth centuries—it was a declaration."

== Paintings ==
The International Slavery Museum, in Liverpool, England, was awarded £50,000 in March 2018 to buy and restore the painting Am I Not a Man and a Brother. The painting dates from around 1800. Another painting is in the Wilberforce House Museum in Hull.

== Gallery ==
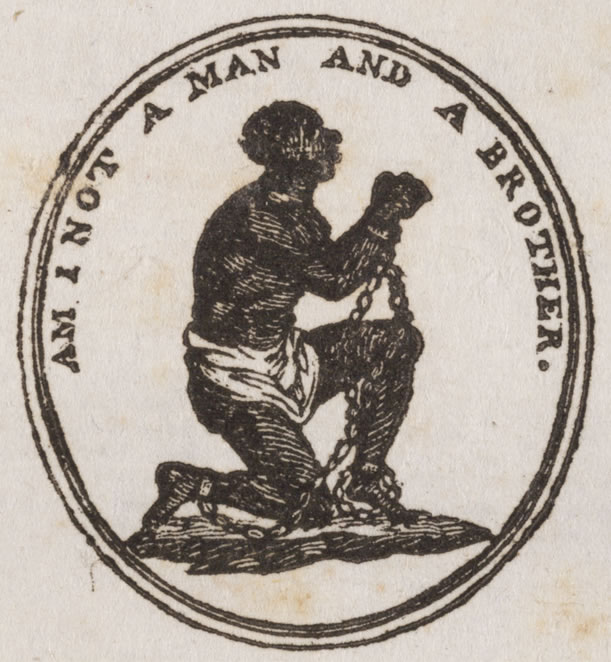
A 1788 engraving of the symbol

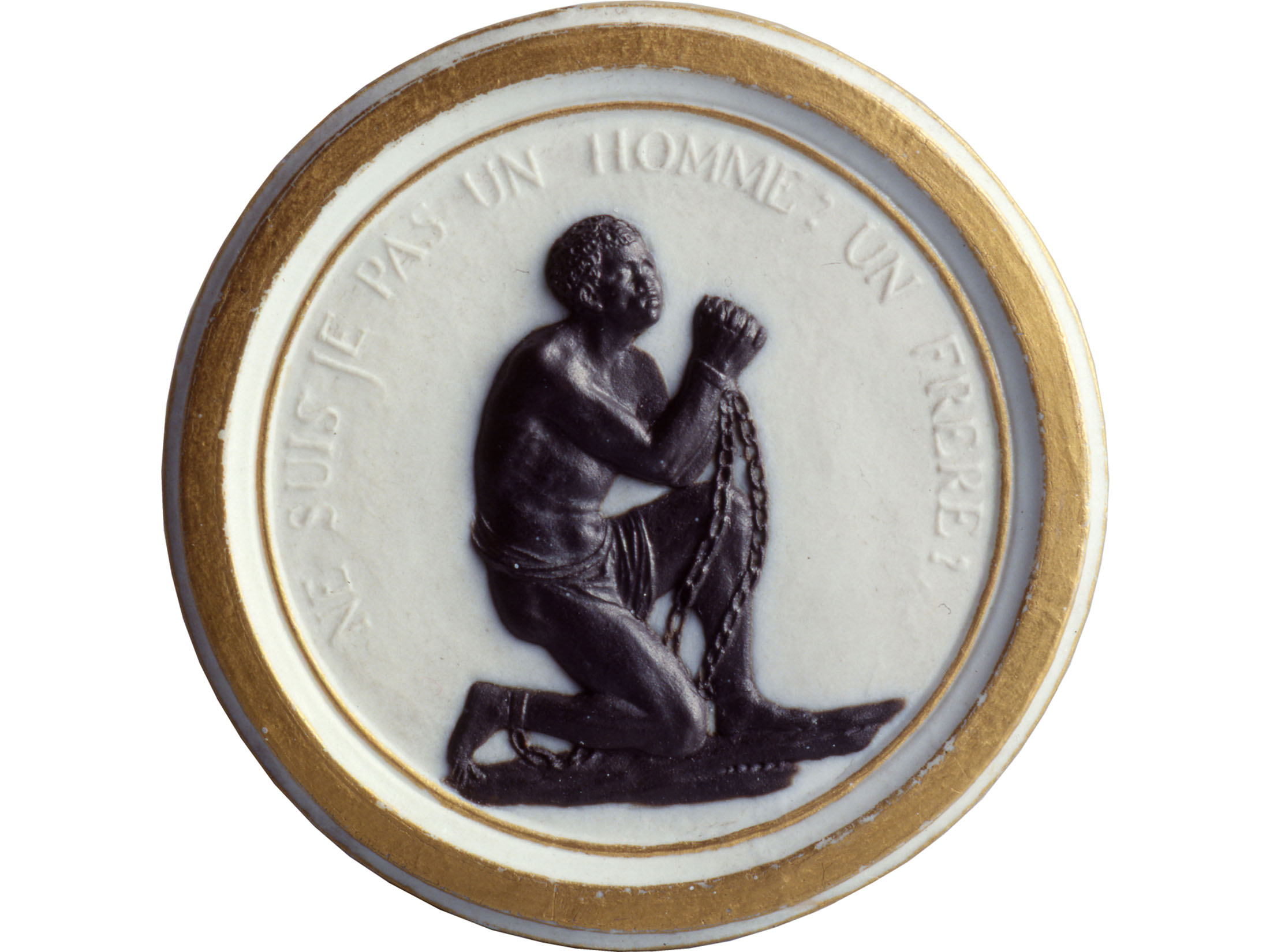
A French version of the medallion produced in 1789 in Sèvres

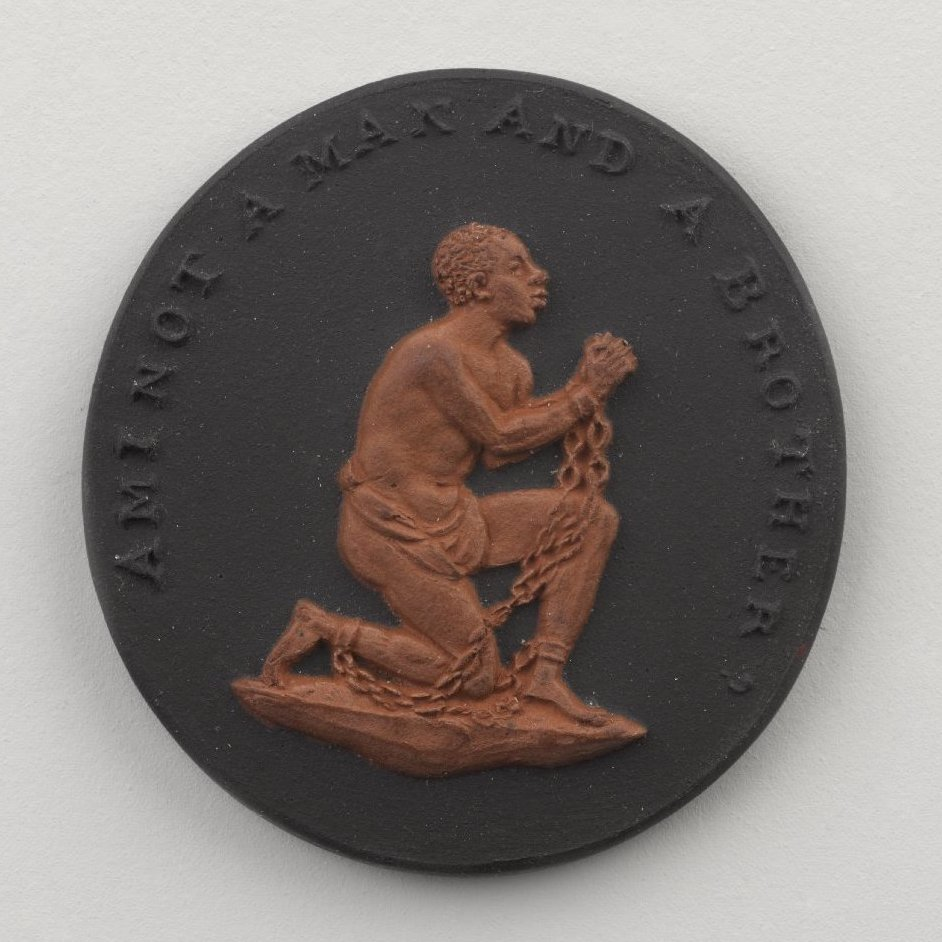
A stoneware version produced by Wedgwood

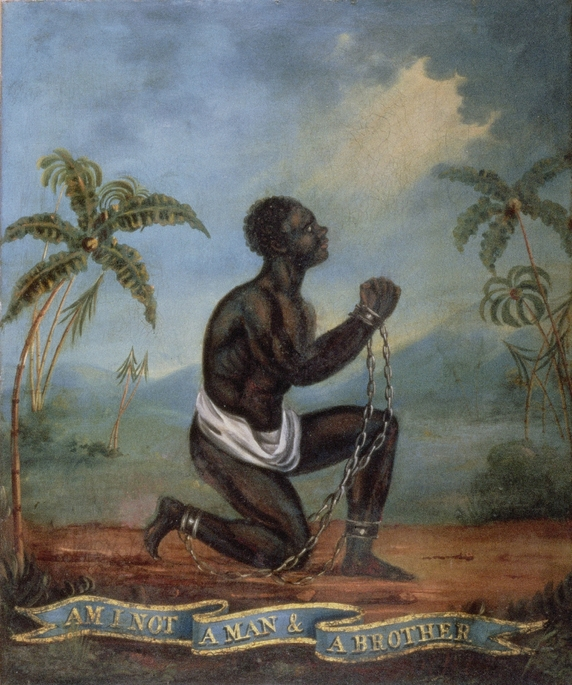
A c. 1800 painting of the kneeling slave figure at Wilberforce House

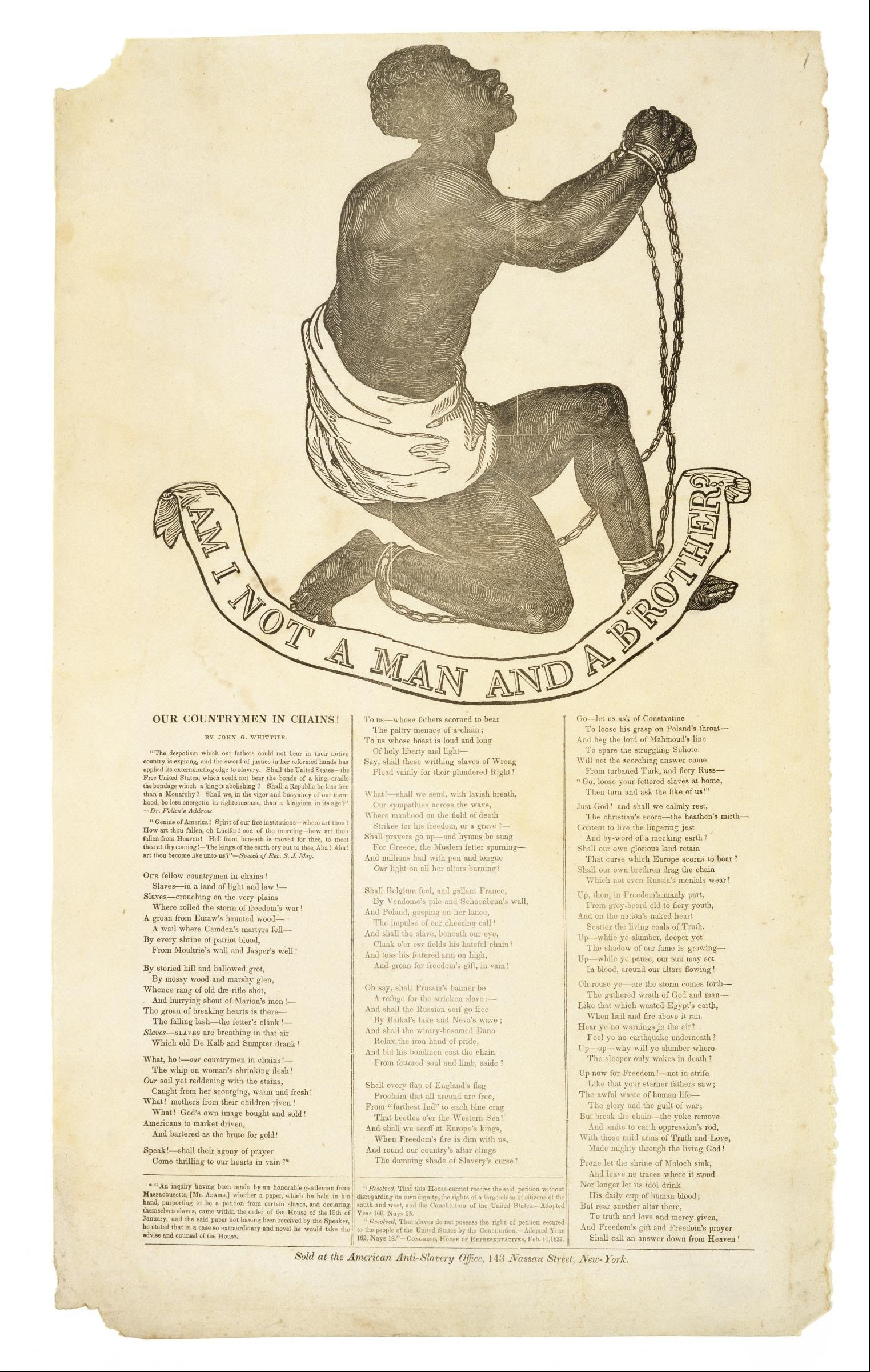
An 1835 broadside of Our Countrymen in Chains by John Greenleaf Whittier featuring the symbol

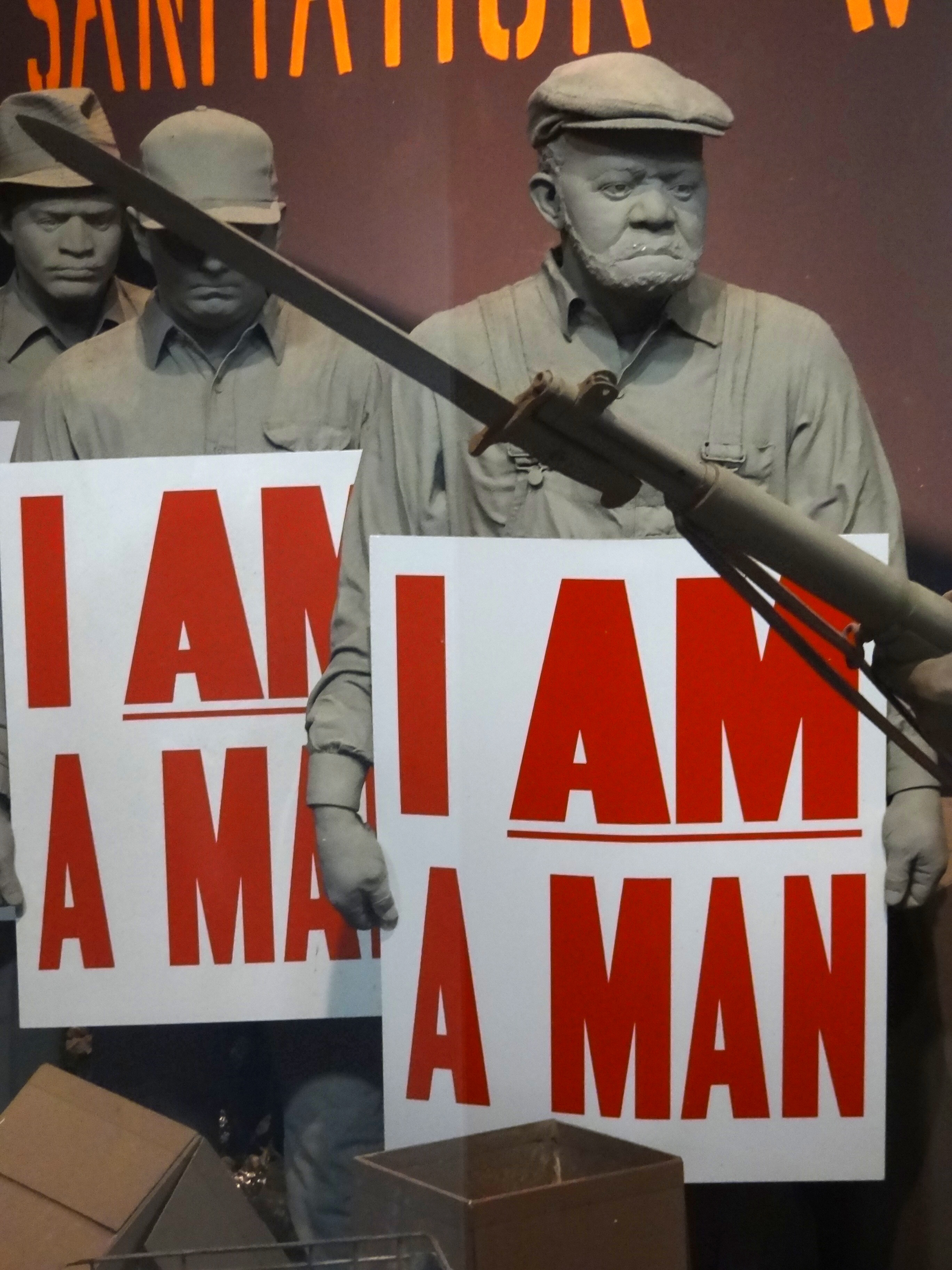
A diorama of the Memphis sanitation strike showing posters reading "I AM A MAN"

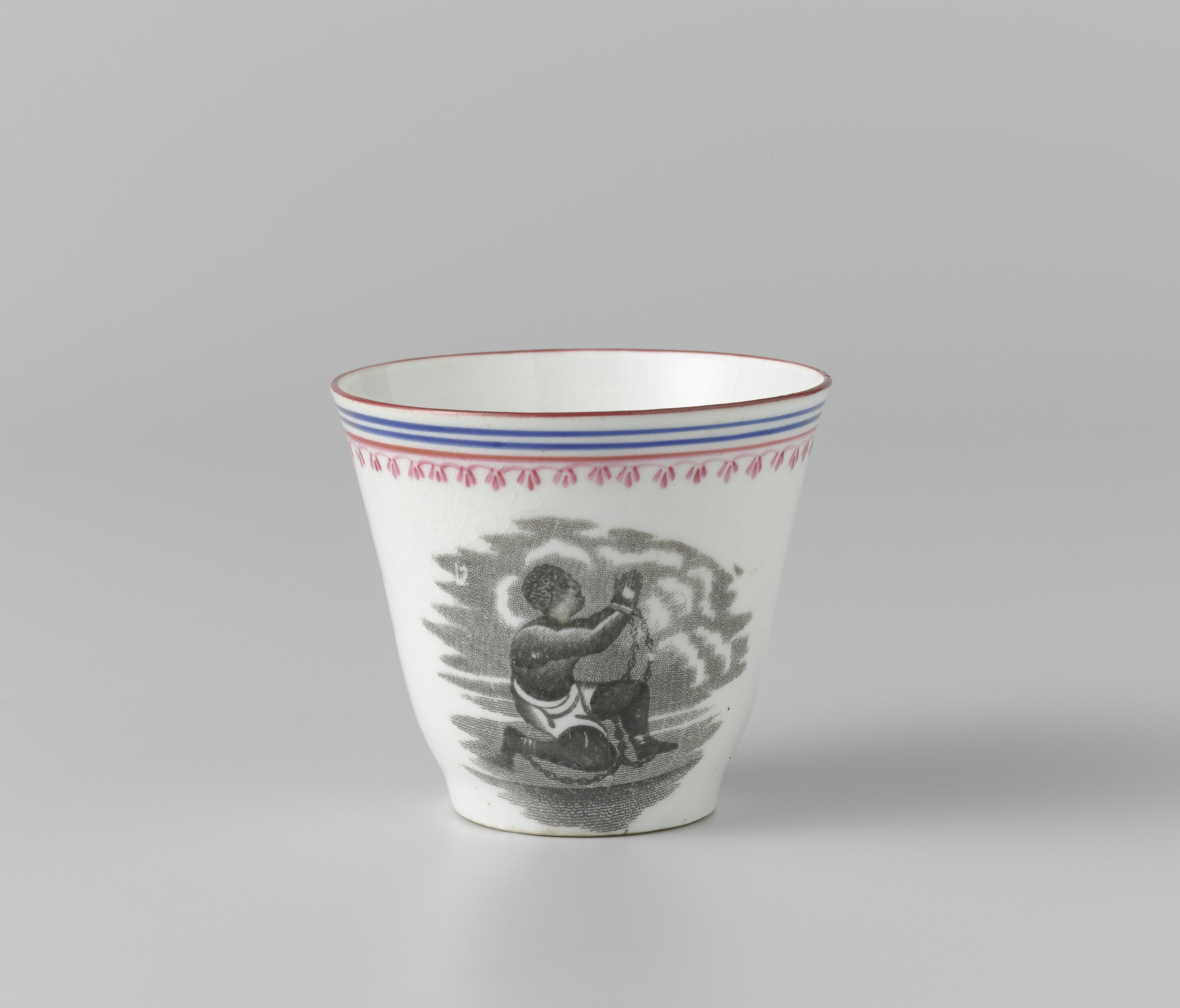
A c. 1860 cup featuring the medallion, likely produced by a Dutch anti-slavery organization

== See also ==
- Representation of slavery in European art
- Emancipation Memorial
- Ain't I a Woman?
