= I Am a Man! =

Civil rights declaration

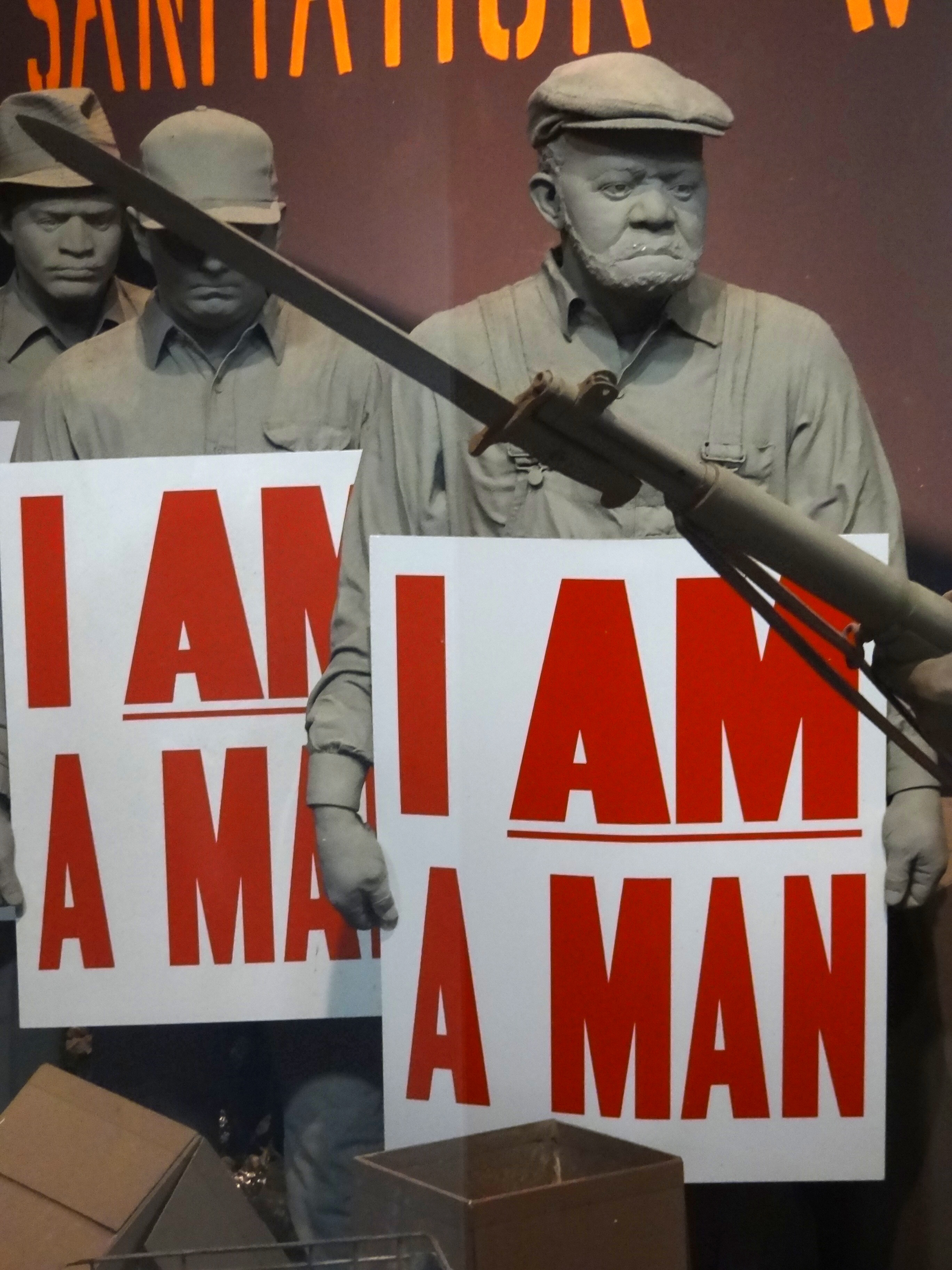
"I Am a Man!" diorama at the National Civil Rights Museum

I Am a Man (stylized: I AM A MAN) is a declaration of civil rights, often used as a personal statement and as a declaration of independence against oppression.

== "Am I not a man?" ==
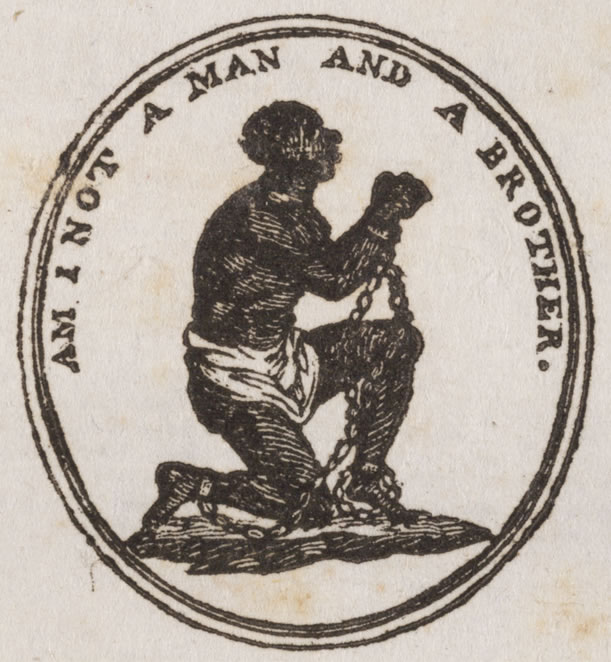
Engraving of the Wedgwood anti-slavery medallion

Historically, in countries such as the United States and South Africa, the term "boy" was used as a pejorative racist insult towards men of color and slaves, indicating their subservient social status of being less than men. In response, "Am I not a man and a brother?" became a catchphrase used by British and American abolitionists. In 1787, Josiah Wedgwood designed the Wedgwood anti-slavery medallion. He copied the original design from the Society for Effecting the Abolition of the Slave Trade as a cameo in black and white. It was widely reproduced and became a popular fashion statement promoting justice, humanity, and freedom.

The question "Am I not a man?" was brought up again during the Dred Scott decision of the U.S. Supreme Court in 1857. During the Civil Rights Movement at the Memphis sanitation strike in 1968, "I Am a Man!" signs were used to answer the same question. On trial for bringing his son back to Nebraska for burial, from a forced march to Oklahoma, in 1879 Ponca Chief Standing Bear spoke to Judge Dundy in his Omaha trial, "That hand is not the color of yours, but if I pierce it, I shall feel pain. If you pierce your hand, you also feel pain. The blood that will flow from mine will be the same color as yours. I am a man. God made us both." Standing Bear (and Native Americans) were granted habeas corpus meaning that they had status in the court and were indeed human beings.

== Modern use ==
"I Am a Man!" has been used as a title for books, plays, and in music and film to assert the rights of all people to be treated with dignity.

"I Am a Man!" was a foundational reference in Derek DelGaudio's theater show "In & Of Itself." DelGaudio created 1,000 "I AM" cards, each with a different descriptor. Before each show, audience members were instructed, "Choose how you wish to be seen."

"I am a man" is one of the many pre-approved social justice messages the NBA allowed their players to display on the back of their jersey during the remainder of the 2019-2020 NBA season. Additional messages include: "Black Lives Matter; Say Their Names; Vote; I Can't Breathe; Justice; Peace; Equality; Freedom; Enough; Power to the People; Justice Now; Say Her Name; Sí Se Puede (Yes We Can); Liberation; See Us; Hear Us; Respect Us; Love Us; Listen; Listen to Us; Stand Up; Ally; Anti-Racist; Speak Up; How Many More; Group Economics; Education Reform; and Mentor" according to the NBAPA.

Untitled (I Am a Man), 1988 painting by Glenn Ligon as a reinterpretation of the signs carried during the Memphis sanitation strike in 1968.

== Other uses ==
- The Elephant Man declares, "I am not an elephant! I am not an animal! I am a human being! I ... am ... a ... man!"

== See also ==
- Ain't I a Woman?
- Death of Echol Cole and Robert Walker
- I Am – Somebody
- Manish Boy
