= Killing of Larry Payne =

1968 death in Memphis, Tennessee

A police officer, Leslie Dean Jones, beats a youth during the violence that erupted on March 28, 1968, in Memphis, Tennessee. Larry Payne, the 17-year-old in the background, was killed by Jones later in the day.

Larry Payne (born in 1950) was a seventeen-year old African American teenager who was murdered by a policeman following a march in support of the Memphis sanitation strike on Thursday, March 28, 1968, in Memphis, Tennessee. He was the only fatality on that day although the New Pittsburgh Courier reported 60 injured and 276 arrested.

Martin Luther King Jr. called Payne's mother, Lizzie Mae Woods Payne (1923–2017), on the phone to console her after her son's killing by Patrolman Leslie Dean Jones.

== Events leading up to Payne's death ==
Conflicting accounts describe the looting that occurred in tandem with the march on Thursday March 28, 1968 that led to a city-wide curfew and Mayor Loeb calling the Tennessese National Guard. According to multiple witnesses, as Payne emerged from the basement in the Fowler Homes housing development, police officer Leslie Dean Jones pressed the barrel of a sawed-off shotgun into Payne's stomach and fired, killing him. It was determined that Payne was emerging from the housing complex's boiler room when Jones shot him. Payne reportedly had his hands up prior to his killing and had asked the officer not to shoot. Jones later claimed that Payne was holding a large butcher knife when he emerged from the basement, a statement denied by witnesses to the killing. The Shelby County grand jury did not press charges, and the U.S. Department of Justice declared that there was insufficient evidence to prosecute Jones when investigating him for civil rights abuses.

A memo which was later published by the Department of Justice in 2011 noted that witness accounts of what had happened varied, aside from the claim that Payne never held a knife. It also revealed that despite witness claims that they didn't see Payne holding the knife, local police were able to provide photo evidence of a butcher knife they stated they found near the boiler room door. The memo also stated that the first Department of Justice investigation against Jones closed in 1971 due to problems with "the credibility of the witnesses and because we cannot explain how a knife was found near the victim"s body." It was also determined by the U.S. Department of Justice's Civil Rights Division in April 2023 that any suggestion that the knife was planted by Jones was not supported by circumstances leading up to the shooting and that both a gunpowder flecking which was found on Payne's left elbow and a gunpowder burn which was found on Payne's left hand indicated that Payne was in fact reaching for Jones with his left arm when Jones shot him.

== Payne's funeral ==
There was a five-hour wake the day before the funeral on April 1, 1968. Six hundred attended his funeral at Clayborn Temple on April 2, 1968. Striking sanitation workers, clergy members who supported the strike, and national television representatives were all in attendance, as well as the students and faculty of Mitchell Road High School where Payne was enrolled prior to his death. Rev. B.T. Dumas, pastor of New Philadelphia Baptist Church gave the eulogy entitled "Man Is Like Grass And Is Cut Down in Various Stages of Life." Rev. Dumas made no reference to the unusual circumstances of Payne's death. Payne's mother, Lizzie, had to be led from the church because she was so full of grief. The Washington Post quoted her as saying: "They killed you like a dog." Payne was buried in the New Park Cemetery in Memphis. His tombstone reads, "Larry 1950-1968 Son".

== Events after Payne's death ==
King planned to visit Payne's mother during his next visit to Memphis, but was killed before the visit could occur. He was assassinated seven days after Payne's killing, on April 4, 1968, when he returned to Memphis in an effort to hold a peaceful march unmarred by looting and violence.

His mother, Lizzie, moved to Flint, Michigan after Payne's death.

Under the Till Act, the case against Jones began another federal review in 2007. It would later be officially closed by the Department of Justice on July 5, 2011, when it was determined that there was not "sufficient evidence to prove beyond a reasonable doubt that the subject willfully used excessive force when he fired his weapon at the victim." Jones later died in April 2019.

In April 2023, the Civil Rights Division official Karla Dobinski would issue a notice to close the case's file.
