= Henry Webber =

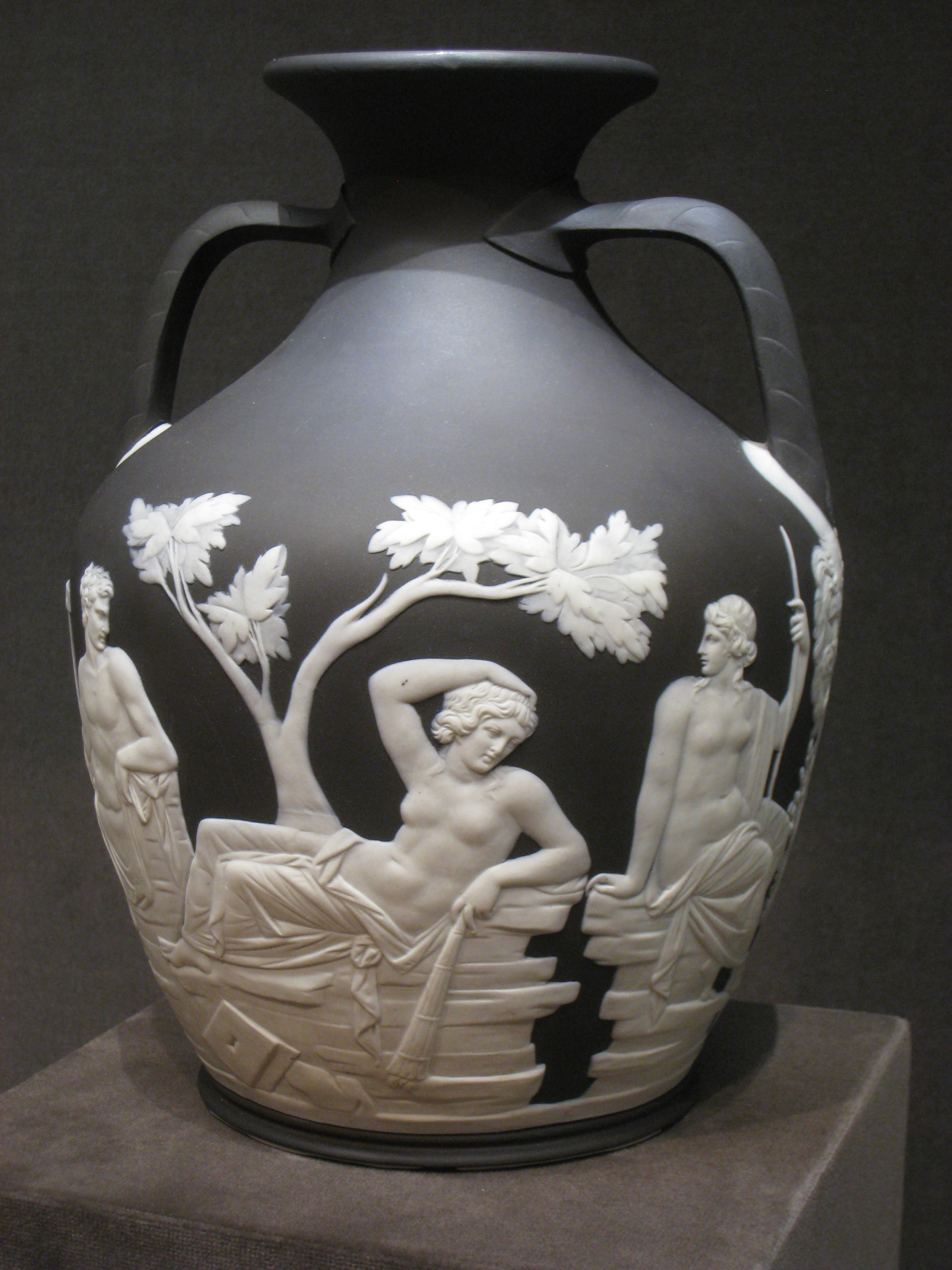
Portland Vase by Josiah Wedgwood & Sons Ltd, circa 1790, in the Cleveland Museum of Art, Cleveland, Ohio, USA

Henry Webber (1754–1826) was an English sculptor and modeller.

== Life ==
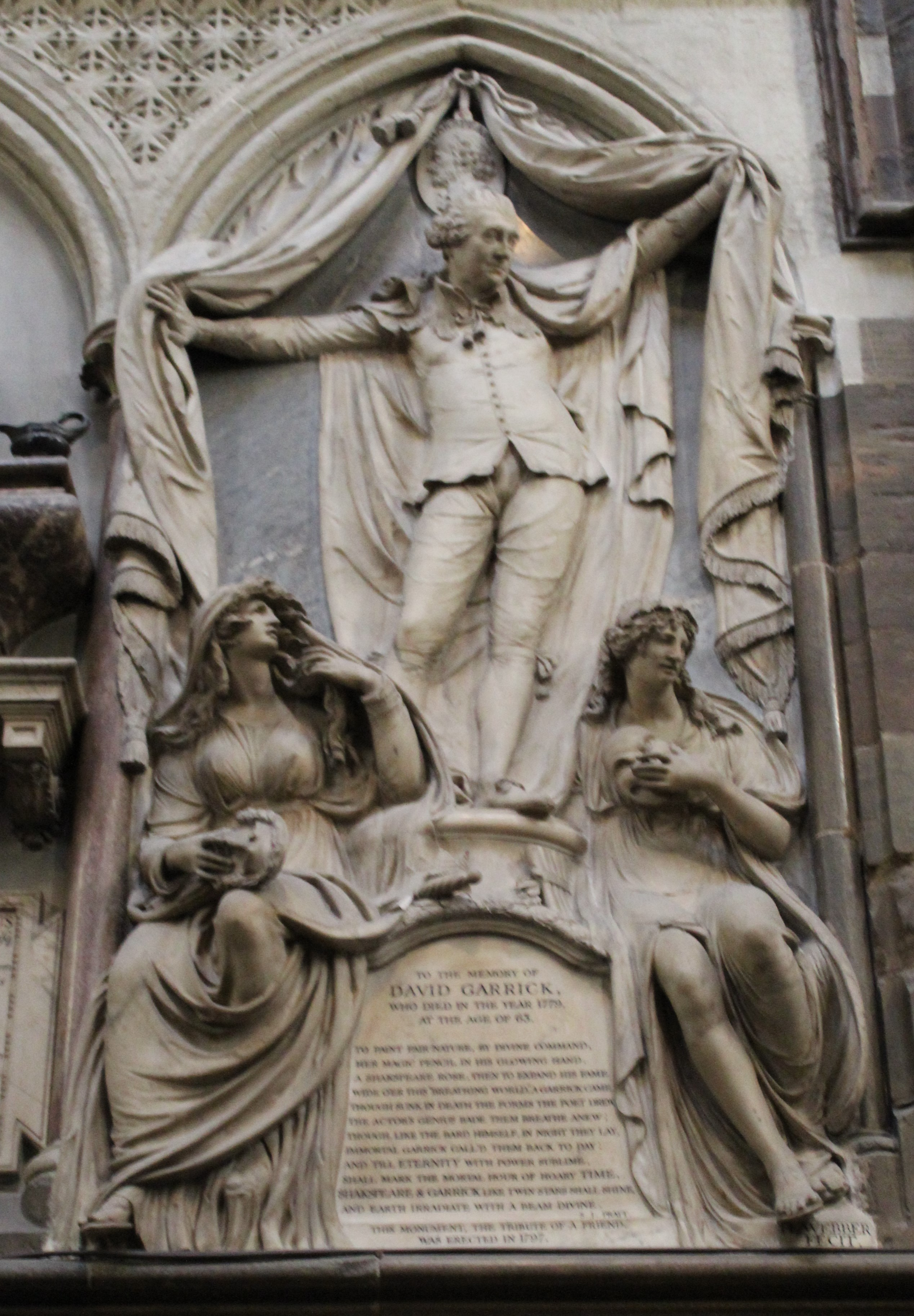
Memorial to David Garrick by Webber in Westminster Abbey

He was born in July 1754, the son of Abraham Webber, a Swiss sculptor who had settled in England, and his English wife, Maria Quandt. He was apprenticed under John Bacon the Elder and attended the Royal Academy Schools. In 1776 he was awarded the Royal Academy Gold Medal. In 1778, Webber was chosen by the Oxford Paving Commission to carry out the sculptures and sphinxes for the balustrade of John Gwynn's Magdalen Bridge; in 1782 the Commission abandoned this idea, paying a compensation payment and permitting him to keep any sculpture already made.

This same year, after being recommended by Sir William Chambers and Sir Joshua Reynolds, Webber started working for Josiah Wedgwood at Etruria, Staffordshire, where he became chief sculptor in 1785, position he held until 1806. In 1787 Wedgwood sent him on a study tour of Rome, and during this trip he also visited his ancestral home in Switzerland and made a trip to Paris. He returned to England in 1789.

Webber is also the author of the monument to David Garrick in Poet's Corner in Westminster Abbey. This had been begun by John Hickey but he had died during the project and it was passed to Webber to complete. He designed several portrait medallions, including the Sydney Cove medallion. He modelled many of the figures for Wedgwood's Portland Vase

He died on 7 August 1826 at the house of Mrs Kincade at 11 South Crescent in Bedford Square in central London.

== Monuments ==
- David Garrick in Westminster Abbey (1797)
- Henry Askew in Newcastle Cathedral (1801)
