= Death of Echol Cole and Robert Walker =

Accidental deaths of two American sanitation workers

Echol Cole and Robert Walker were sanitation workers who died accidentally in Memphis, Tennessee at the corner of Colonial Rd. and Verne Rd. on February 1, 1968. While working that day, the pair sought refuge from a rainstorm in the compactor area of their garbage truck. The two African American men were prevented from seeking shelter from the rain inside a building due to segregation laws. They were killed when the compactor accidentally activated. Their deaths were a precursor to the Memphis sanitation strike, during which the prominent civil rights leader Martin Luther King Jr. was assassinated.

== Accidental deaths ==
Cole (age 36) and Walker (age 30) were both sanitation workers in Memphis, Tennessee. Both reported for work on February 1, 1968, a day the rain would be later reported as torrential, overflowing the sewers and flooding the streets. While on shift, at around 4:20 pm, the pair sought refuge in the back of their truck during a rainstorm. A malfunction followed, and both men were crushed to death by the truck's garbage compactor. Their coworker Elester Gregory, who had been riding in the cab of the truck, said "The motor started racing and the driver stopped and ran around and smashed that button to stop that thing ... I didn’t know what was happening. It looked to me like one of them almost got out, but he got caught and just fell back in there.”

== Repercussions ==
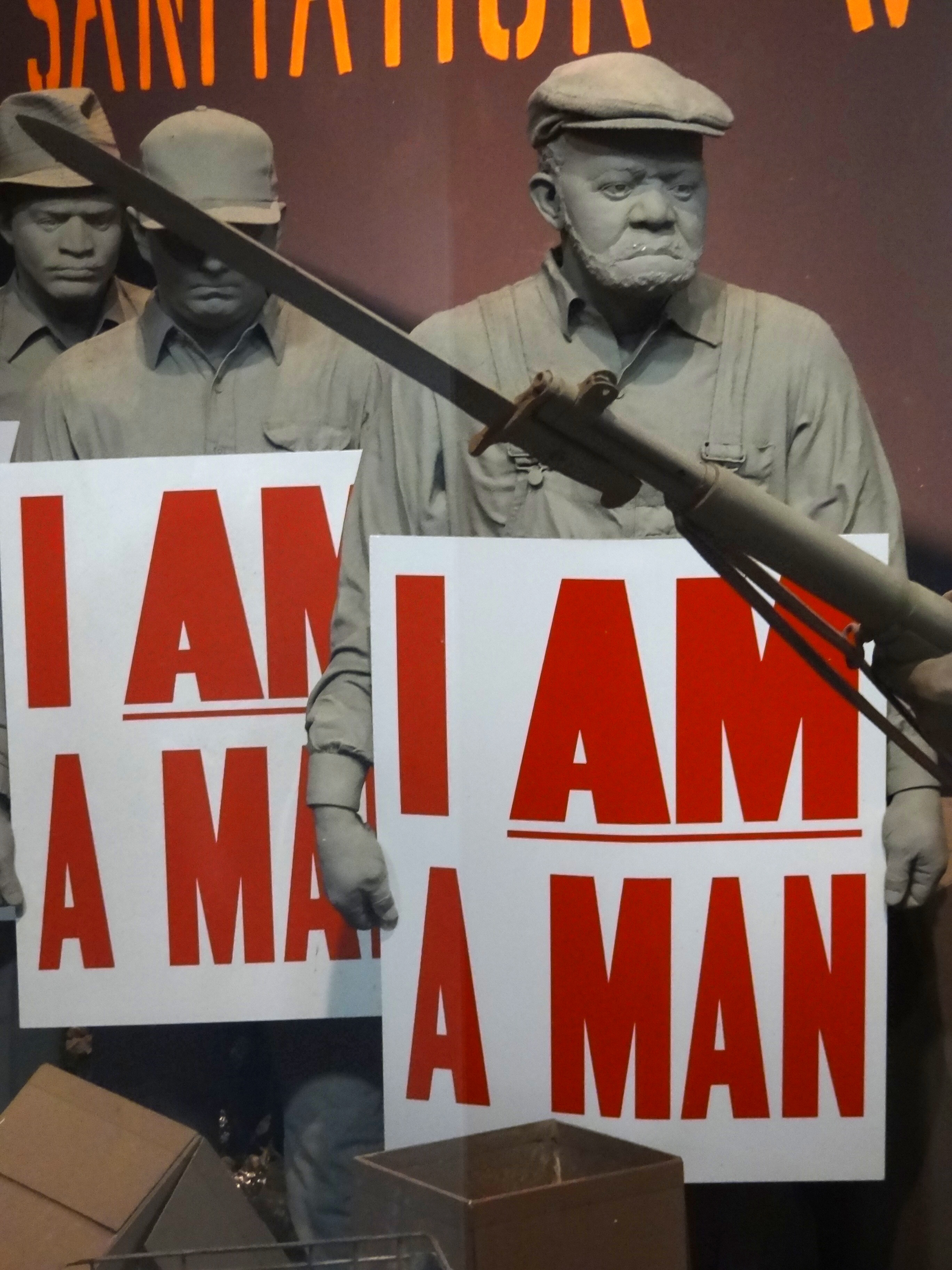
"I Am a Man!" diorama at the National Civil Rights Museum

Following their deaths, their widows received no insurance benefits; the city offered one month's pay for each man, and $500 for funeral expenses. Black Memphians donated US$100,000 to the widows; the United Auto Workers donated an additional US$25,000.

The deaths of Cole and Walker proved to be the catalyst for the Memphis sanitation strike. On February 11, ten days after their deaths, union Local 1733 held a strike meeting where over 400 workers complained that the city refused to provide decent wages and working conditions. The workers wanted immediate action but the city refused.

On Monday February 12, 1968, 930 of 1100 sanitation workers did not show up for work, including 214 of 230 sewer drainage workers. Only 38 of the 108 garbage trucks continued to move.

Their deaths, together with many racial and working-class injustices prompted Martin Luther King Jr. to join a citywide march on March 18. The march ended with police action, but another was scheduled. King was assassinated the evening before the second march. Taylor Branch writes:

It was a gruesome chore to retrieve the two crushed bodies from the garbage packer and pronounce them dead at John Gaston Hospital. Echol Cole and Robert Walker soon became the anonymous cause that diverted Martin Luther King to Memphis for his last march. City flags flew at half-mast for them, but they never were public figures like Lisa Marie Presley, whose birth at 5:01 PM was being announced. [...] Cole and Walker would not be listed among civil rights martyrs, nor studied like Rosa Parks as the catalyst for a new movement. Their fate was perhaps too lowly and pathetic.

== See also ==
- I Am a Man!
