= Memphis sanitation strike =

1968 American strike

- Part of the Civil Rights Movement
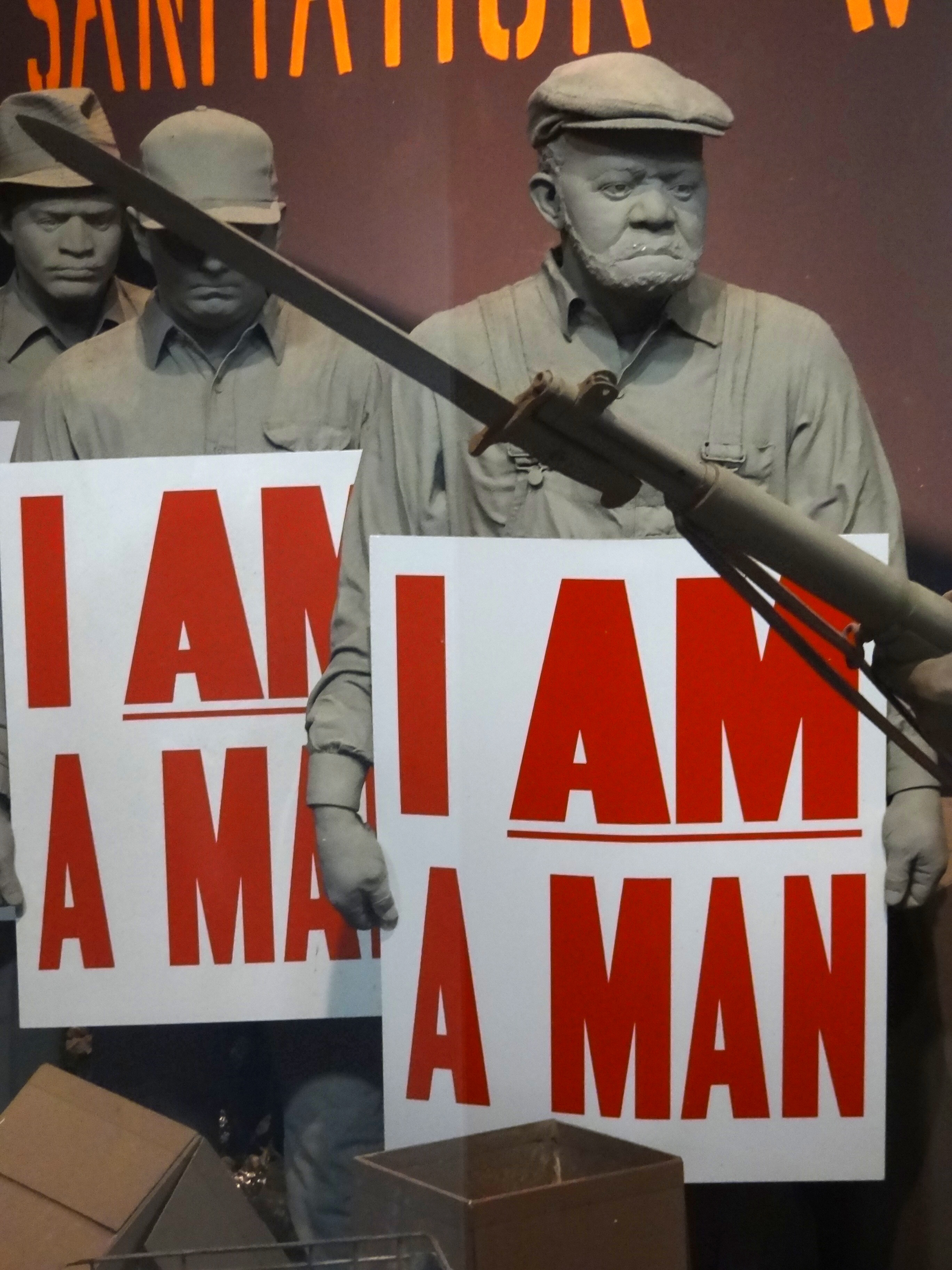
- The strikers' slogan was "I AM a Man".
- Date: February 12 – April 16, 1968 (2 months and 4 days)
- Location: Memphis, Tennessee, Charles Mason Temple, Clayborn Temple
- Caused by: Racial discrimination faced by black sanitation workers; Death of Echol Cole and Robert Walker from garbage compactor; Black sanitation workers exposed to dangerous working conditions
- Result: Larry Payne killed by police during march and disorder; Speech "I've Been to the Mountaintop" delivered by Martin Luther King Jr.; Assassination of Martin Luther King Jr. on April 4, 1968; Union AFSCME local 1733 recognized by City of Memphis; Increased wages for sanitation workers by City of Memphis

Parties
Sanitation workers; American Federation of State, County and Municipal Employees (AFSCME); Community on the Move for Equality (COME); Southern Christian Leadership Conference (SCLC); National Association for the Advancement of Colored People (NAACP)	City of Memphis

Lead figures
Sanitation workers: T. O. Jones; Southern Christian Leadership Conference: Martin Luther King Jr. †	Mayor of Memphis: Henry Loeb

The Memphis sanitation strike began on February 12, 1968, in response to the deaths of sanitation workers Echol Cole and Robert Walker. The deaths served as a breaking point for more than 1,300 African American men from the Memphis Department of Public Works as they demanded higher wages, time and a half overtime, dues check-off, safety measures, and pay for the rainy days when they were told to go home.

The Memphis sanitation strike was led by T.O. Jones and had the support of Jerry Wurf, president of the American Federation of State, County, and Municipal Employees (AFSCME) and the local branch of the National Association for the Advancement of Colored People (NAACP). The AFSCME was chartered in 1964 by the state; the city of Memphis refused to recognize it.

Mayor Henry Loeb refused to recognize the strike and rejected the City Council vote, insisting that only he possessed the power to recognize the union. The Memphis sanitation strike prompted Martin Luther King Jr.'s presence, where he famously gave the "I've Been to the Mountaintop" speech a day before his assassination.

== Background ==
The city of Memphis had a long history of segregation and unfair treatment for Black residents. The influential politician E. H. Crump had created a city police force, much of it culled from the Ku Klux Klan, that acted violently toward the Black population and maintained Jim Crow. Black people were excluded from unions and paid much less than Whites—conditions which persisted and sometimes worsened in the first half of the 20th century.

During the New Deal, Black people were able to organize as part of the Congress of Industrial Organizations, a group which Crump called communist "nigger unionism." However, organized Black labor was set back by anti-communist fear after World War II. Civil rights and unionism in Memphis were thus heavily stifled all through the 1950s.

The civil rights struggle was renewed in the 1960s, starting with desegregation sit-ins in the summer of 1960. The NAACP and SCLC were particularly active in Memphis during this period.

Memphis sanitation workers were mostly Black. They enjoyed few of the protections that other workers had; their pay was low and they could be fired (usually by White supervisors) without warning. In 1960 the average sanitation worker in Memphis earned $0.94–$1.14 an hour, however in 1968 sanitation laborers earned $1.60 an hour and garbage truck drivers earned $1.90 an hour ($15 and $18 respectively in 2025 dollars). In addition to their sanitation work, often including unpaid overtime, many worked other jobs or appealed to welfare and public housing.

=== Union activities ===
In the early 1960s, Black sanitation workers united together to gain better wages and working conditions, fighting the racial discrimination in the Memphis Public Works Department. The first attempt to strike was in 1963, but it failed because there was inadequate organization. Many Black people were afraid to unionize due to the fear of persecution, which was justified in 1963, when 33 sanitation workers were fired immediately after attending an organizing meeting. In November 1964, Local 1733 of the American Federation of State, County, and Municipal Employees (AFSCME) was successfully formed by T.O. Jones. However, the city officials refused to recognize the union. In 1966, the union attempted another strike, but it was thwarted before it began when the city prepared strikebreakers and threatened to jail leaders. The failure of the strike was largely due to the lack of support of Memphis' religious community or middle class.

== Early course of the strike ==
At the end of 1967, Henry Loeb was elected as mayor against the opposition of Memphis's Black community. Loeb had served previously as the head of the sanitation division (as the elected Public Works Commissioner), and during his tenure oversaw grueling work conditions — including no city-issued uniforms, no restrooms, and no grievance procedure for the numerous occasions on which they were underpaid.

Upon taking office, Loeb increased regulations on the city's workers and appointed Charles Blackburn as the Public Works Commissioner. Loeb ordered Jones and the union to deal with Blackburn; Blackburn said he had no authority to change the city's policies.

On February 1, Echol Cole and Robert Walker, two sanitation workers, were crushed to death in a garbage compactor where they were taking shelter from the rain. Two other men had died this way in 1964, but the city refused to replace the defective equipment. Local 1733 held a strike meeting on February 11 where over 400 workers explained that the city refused to provide decent wages and working conditions. The workers wanted immediate action but the city refused. The next day fewer than 200 employees showed up for work, and only 38 of the 108 garbage trucks continued to move.

On Monday February 12, 1968, 930 of 1100 sanitation workers did not show up for work, including 214 of 230 sewer drainage workers. Elmore Nickelberry, who was one of the strikers during this time speaks of Mayor Loeb and how it was impossible to negotiate with him, due to him being a "stubborn man". Ben Jones, another striker with 43 years on the job, spoke of the conditions that all sanitation workers had to deal with, including how heavy all the garbage bins were and how they would leak all over them. They would end up at the end of the day smelling real bad when they would return to department headquarters and would go home to families who did not want to be around them. As they would march down Main St., looters would ransack stores and tear gas was thrown at them, stated Rev. Leslie Moore. Moore also speaks of the song they would sing titled, "Ain't Gonna Let Nobody Turn Me Around", as they would march. Some of those who did show up walked off when they found out about the apparent strike. Mayor Loeb, infuriated, refused to meet with the strikers. The workers marched from their union hall to a meeting at the City Council chamber; there, they were met with 40–50 police officers. Loeb led the workers to a nearby auditorium, where he asked them to return to work. At one point, Loeb grabbed the microphone from AFSCME organizer Bill Lucy and shouted for the strikers to "go back to work!". The crowd responded with laughter and boos. Loeb then observed and spoke, "I have sat here and taken quite a bit of abuse and I do not appreciate it, and I have not given any abuse back, your jobs are important and I promise you the garbage is going to be picked up, bet on it." Thereupon the mayor stormed out of the room.

By February 15, there was 10,000 tons of noticeable piled up trash, and Loeb began to hire strikebreakers. These individuals were White and traveled with police escorts. They were not well received by the strikers, and the strikers assaulted the strikebreakers in some cases.

On February 18, AFSCME International President Jerry Wurf arrives in Memphis, exclaiming that the strike will only end when the workers' demands are met. Wurf worked with national union representative P.J. Ciampa and local union leaders to edit the strikers' list of demands. The revised version of demands included 10% wage increase, a grievance procedure, fair promotion policies, sick leave, pension programs, health insurance, payroll deduction of union dues, and union recognition through a written contract. Mayor Loeb continued to refuse union recognition and dues withdrawn from wages because he argued that AFSCME officials only wanted to fill their pockets with the hard-earned money of local Memphians. Loeb believed that he was the sanitation workers' keeper and he would not abandon his "moral obligation" to protect them from union officials. Local Black leaders and sanitation workers saw this "rhetoric smacked of paternalism reminiscent of slavery." The sanitation workers were men and were more than capable of making their own decisions.

By February 21, the sanitation workers established a daily routine of meeting at noon with nearly a thousand strikers and then marching from Clayborn Temple to downtown. On February 22, workers and their supporters performed a sit in at city hall where they pressured the City Council to recognize their union and recommend wages to increase. The mayor rejected the request. The first large-scale protest of Loeb's policies came on February 23. It was given the moniker "mini riot" after it turned violent. Gwen Robinson Awsumb, the city council liaison to the mayor, accused Loeb of deliberately impeding the council's progress in resolving the strike. The marchers faced police brutality in the forms of mace, tear gas, and billy clubs. On February 24, while addressing the strikers after a "police assault" on their protests, Reverend James Lawson said, "For at the heart of racism is the idea that a man is not a man, that a person is not a person. You are human beings. You are men. You deserve dignity." Rev. Lawson's comments embody the message behind the iconic placards from the sanitation workers' strike, "I Am A Man".

On the evening of February 26, Clayborn Temple held over a thousand supporters of the movement. Reverend Ralph Jackson charged the crowd to not rest until "justice and jobs" prevailed for all Black Americans. That night they raised $1,600 to support the Movement. Rev. Jackson declared further that once the immediate demands of the strikers were met, the movement would focus on ending police brutality, as well as improving housing and education across the city for Black Memphians.

Our Henry, who art in City Hall,
Hard-headed be thy name.
Thy kingdom C.O.M.E.
Our will be done,
In Memphis, as it is in heaven.
Give us this day our Dues Checkoff,
And forgive us our boycott,
As we forgive those who spray MACE against us.
And lead us not into shame,
But deliver us from LOEB!
For OURS is justice, jobs, and dignity,
Forever and ever. Amen. FREEDOM!

— "Sanitation Workers' Prayer" recited by Reverend Malcolm Blackburn

National civil rights leaders including Roy Wilkins, Bayard Rustin, and James Lawson came to Memphis to rally the sanitation workers. On March 18, Martin Luther King Jr. came to Memphis to praise a 25,000 crowd of labor and civil right activists for their unity stating, "You are demonstrating that we can stick together. You are demonstrating that we are all tied in a single garment of destiny, and that if one Black person suffers, if one Black person is down, we are all down." King encouraged the group to continue to support the sanitation strike by enacting a citywide work stoppage. King promised to return to Memphis on March 22 to lead a protest through the city. On March 22, a massive snowstorm hit Memphis, causing the organizers to reschedule the march for March 28.

== March 28 riot and police shooting of Larry Payne ==
On March 28, King and Reverend Lawson led strikers and supporters in a march in downtown Memphis. City officials estimated that 22,000 students skipped school to participate in the march. King arrived late to find a massive crowd on the brink of chaos, causing Lawson and King to call off the demonstration as violence erupted. After peacefully marching for several blocks, singing "We Shall Overcome", Black armed men with iron pipes and bricks, and carrying signs, began smashing windows and looting along the stores. Police immediately reacted to the riot, moving into the crowd with nightsticks, mace, teargas, and gunfire. They arrested 280 individuals and 60 were reported injured, most of them Black. Lawson told the demonstration participants to return to Clayborn Temple. The police followed the crowd back to the church where they released tear gas and clubbed people. In the midst of the chaos, police officer Leslie Dean Jones shot and killed sixteen-year-old Larry Payne. Witnesses said Payne had his hands raised as the officer pressed a shotgun to Payne's stomach and fired it' in later years, federal investigations questioned the accuracy of this claim. That same night Loeb declared martial law and authorized a 7 pm curfew, bringing about 4000 National Guardsmen.

On April 2, Payne's funeral was held in Clayborn Temple. Despite police pressure to have a private closed-casket funeral in their home, the family held the funeral at Clayborn and had an open casket. Following the funeral, the sanitation workers marched peacefully downtown.

=== Media coverage ===
The local news media were generally favorable to Loeb, portraying union leaders (and later Martin Luther King Jr.) as meddling outsiders. The Commercial Appeal wrote editorials (and published cartoons) praising the mayor for his toughness. Newspapers and television stations generally portrayed the mayor as calm and reasonable, and the protesters and organizers as unruly and disorganized.

The Tri-State Defender, an African American newspaper, and The Sou'wester, a local college newspaper, reported the events of the strike from the sanitation workers' perspective. These publications emphasized the brutality of the police reactions to the protestors.

== Roles of the union ==
Membership in Local 1733 increased substantially during the course of the strike, more than doubling in the first few days. Its relationship with other unions was complex.

=== National leadership ===
The AFSCME leadership in Washington was initially upset to learn of the strike, which they thought would not succeed. P. J. Ciampa, a field organizer for the AFL–CIO, reportedly reacted to news of the strike saying, "Good God Almighty, I need a strike in Memphis like I need another hole in the head!" However, both AFSCME and the AFL–CIO sent representatives to Memphis; these organizers came to support the strike upon recognizing the determination of the workers.

Jones, Lucy, Ciampa, and other union leaders, asked the striking workers to focus on labor solidarity and downplay racism. The workers refused. AFSCME, especially its Local 1733, played a crucial role in supporting the Memphis sanitation workers during their 1968 strike. The union helped the workers organize their demands for fair wages, safer working conditions, and respect. They also brought national attention to the strike by connecting it to larger civil rights and labor issues. Beyond advocacy, AFSCME provided practical support, including legal aid for workers arrested during protests and financial assistance for their families, ensuring they could endure the long strike. The union also applied significant political and social pressure on the city of Memphis to recognize them as the workers' official bargaining representative. A major turning point came when AFSCME and local leaders involved Dr. Martin Luther King Jr., whose presence and famous "I've Been to the Mountaintop" speech gave the movement national significance, highlighting the deep connection between labor rights and civil rights.

=== Local unions ===
During the strike, Local 1733 received direct support from URW Local 186. Local 186 had the largest Black membership in Memphis, and allowed the strikers to use their union hall for meetings. Most White union leaders in Memphis expressed concern about race riots. Tommy Powell, president of the Memphis Labor Council, was one of few local White advocates.

== End of the strike ==
On April 3, King returned to Memphis where he famously gave his "I've been to the mountaintop" speech.

"I've seen the Promised Land. I may not get there with you. But I want you to know tonight, that we, as a people, will get to the Promised Land! And so I'm happy, tonight. I'm not worried about anything. I'm not fearing any man. Mine eyes have seen the glory of the coming of the Lord!"

— Dr. Martin Luther King Jr.

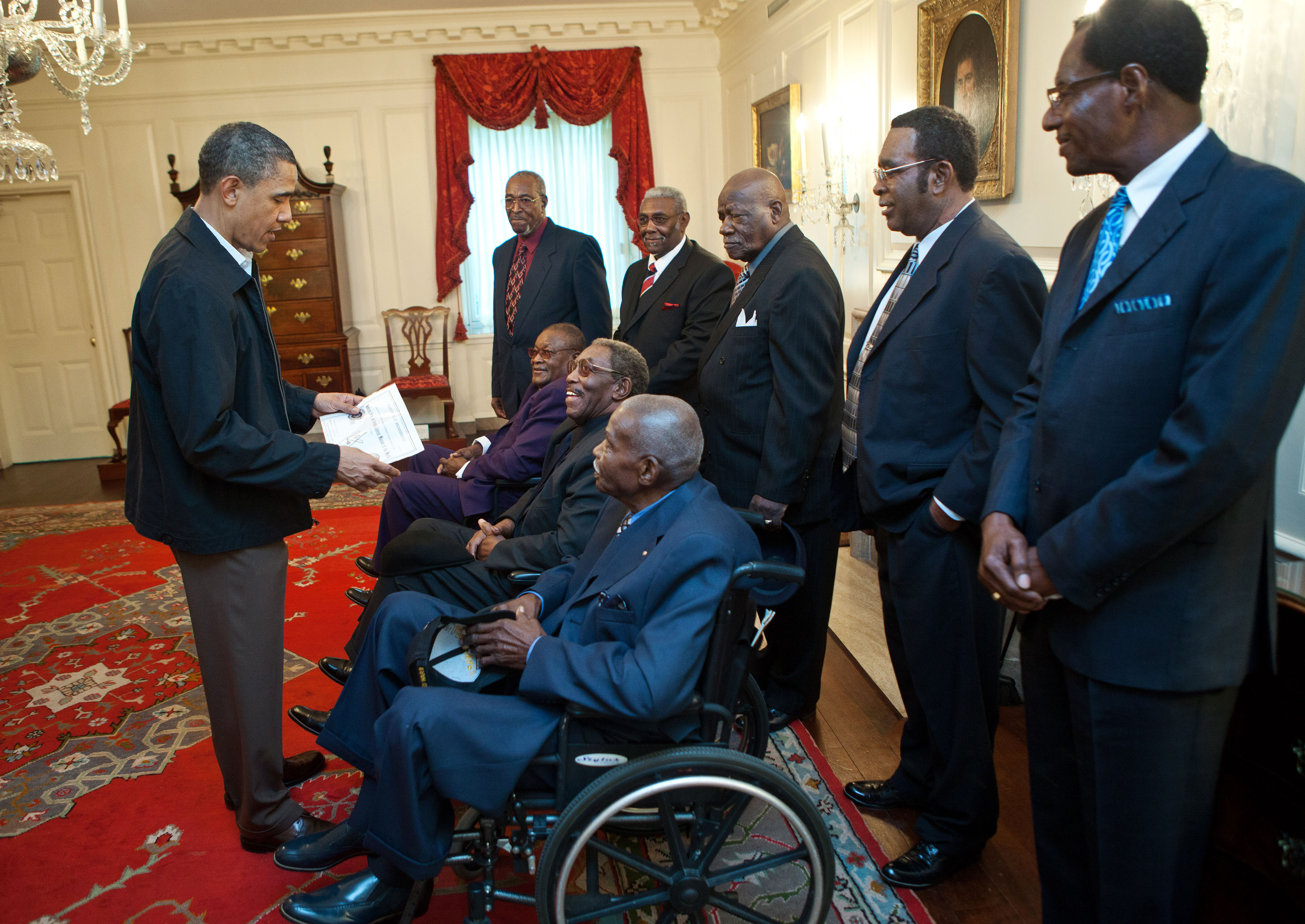
President Obama met former members of the strike in 2011

King's assassination (April 4, 1968) intensified the strike. Mayor Loeb and others feared rioting, which had already begun in Washington, D.C., Federal officials, including Attorney General Ramsey Clark, urged Loeb to make concessions to the strikers in order to avoid violence. Loeb refused. On April 8, a completely silent march with the SCLC, Coretta Scott King, and UAW president Walter Reuther attracted 42,000 participants. Reuther wrote a check for $50,000 to the striking sanitation workers, the largest contribution from any outside source. The strike ended on April 16, 1968, with a settlement that included union recognition and wage increases, although additional strikes had to be threatened to force the City of Memphis to honor its agreements. The period was a turning point for Black activism and union activity in Memphis.

== Legacy ==
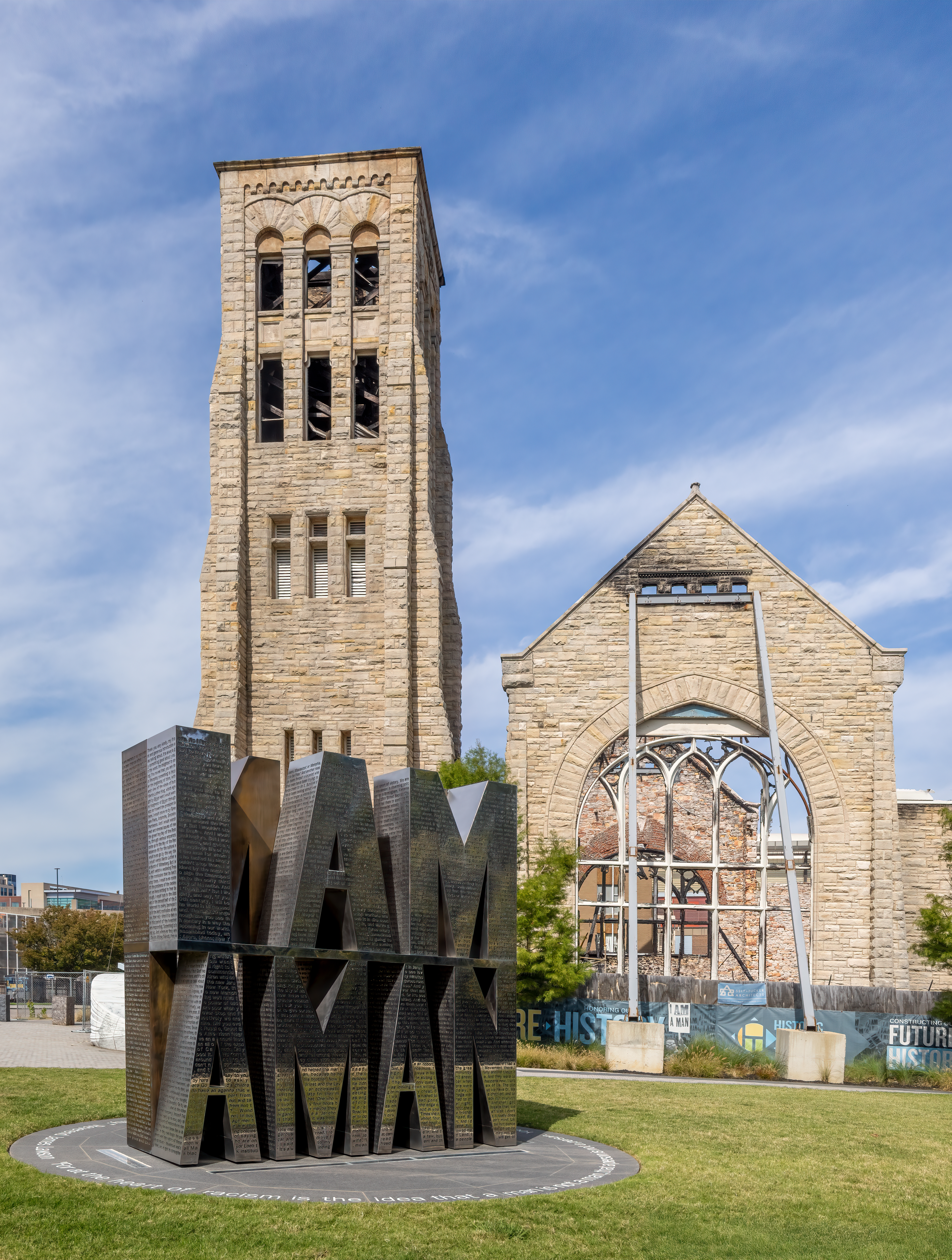
I Am a Man Plaza, a site honoring the strike, with the ruins of Clayborn Temple after it was set on fire in 2025

In July 2017, Memphis Mayor Jim Strickland announced that the city would offer $50,000 in tax-free grants to the 14 surviving 1968 sanitation strikers, who were either still on payroll to maintain standard of living or could not retire in relative comfort as they had to forgo pension and thus receiving a small Social Security check monthly.

In October 2017, Baxter Leach represented the sanitation strikers at the National Civil Rights Museum Freedom Awards. Leach was one of the original sanitation workers who participated in the Memphis sanitation strike and served as the public face of the surviving sanitation workers.

In 2018, Leach along with the other surviving sanitation strikers was presented with the NAACP Vanguard Award. After Martin Luther King Jr. was killed, the Memphis sanitation workers' strike went from being a local labor fight to a national issue. This was because King was dedicated to giving sanitation workers better working conditions and more respect. Many people felt terrible about his death, which led to more support for the strike from a wide range of groups, including community and church leaders, local and national labor groups, and regular people. Even groups that weren't active before, like white religious leaders and the business community in Memphis, spoke out in favor of a solution. In response to the shock and interest across the country, the U.S. government sent Undersecretary of Labor James Reynolds to mediate on behalf of President Lyndon B. Johnson. Reynolds brought important resources and pressure to the table, which eventually led local leaders to come to an agreement. King's death showed how powerful his moral and symbolic leadership was. Even after he died, it continued to bring people together in the civil rights movement and help heal social wounds. Aside from the direct effects, Memphis business leaders, worried about the city's reputation, put even more pressure on officials to end the strike quickly. They knew that a prolonged conflict would hurt the city's reputation and economy. King's legacy lived on through these things, making civil rights efforts stronger and showing how a leader's influence can last and shape social justice campaigns long after they are gone.

== See also ==
- Labor Hall of Honor
- List of incidents of civil unrest in the United States
- St. Petersburg sanitation strike of 1968
- Charleston sanitation strike of 1969

== Bibliography ==
- Honey, Michael K. (2007). Going Down Jericho Road: The Memphis Strike, Martin Luther King's Last Campaign. New York: W. W. Norton & Company. ISBN 9780393043396.
