= Tin-glazing =

Ceramic glazing process

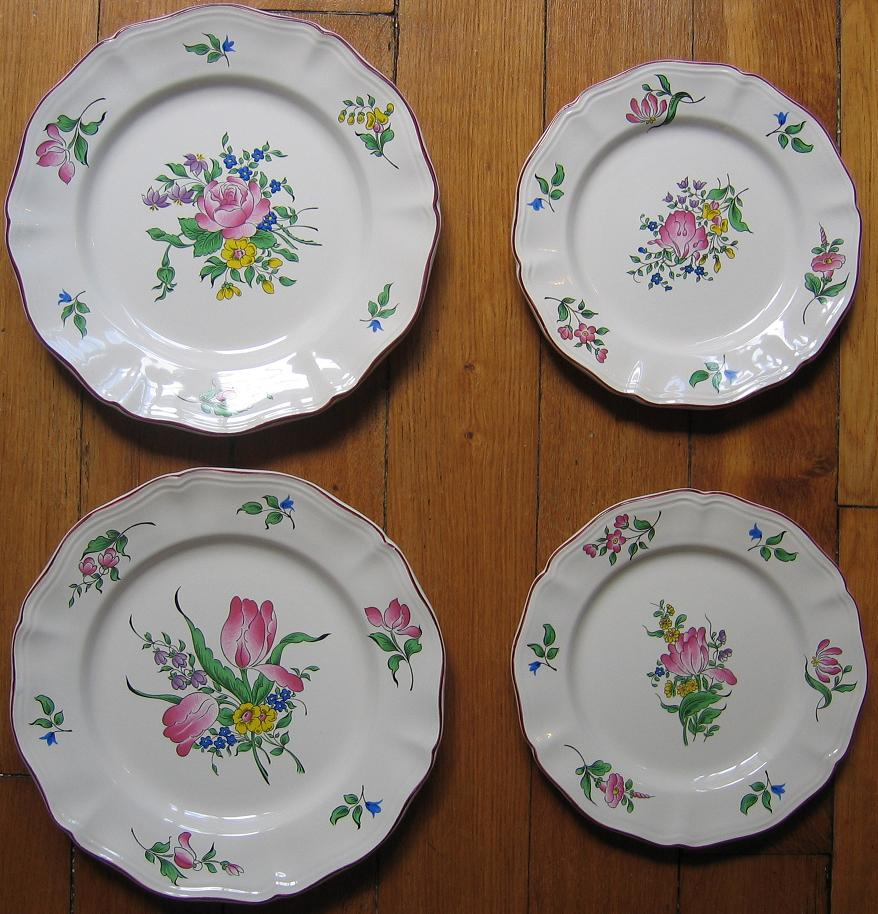
French faience, from Lunéville

Tin-glazing is the process of giving tin-glazed pottery items a ceramic glaze that is white, glossy and opaque, which is normally applied to red or buff earthenware. Tin-glaze is plain lead glaze with a small amount of tin oxide added. The opacity and whiteness of tin glaze encourage its frequent decoration. Historically this has mostly been done before the single firing, when the colours blend into the glaze, but since the 17th century also using overglaze enamels, with a light second firing, allowing a wider range of colours. Majolica, maiolica, delftware and faience are among the terms used for common types of tin-glazed pottery.

An alternative is lead-glazing, where the basic glaze is transparent; some types of pottery use both. However, when pieces are glazed only with lead, the glaze becomes fluid during firing, and may run or pool. Colours painted on the glaze may also run or blur. Tin-glazing avoids these problems.

The technique originated in the Near East and reached Europe during the late Middle Ages, with a peak in Italian Renaissance maiolica. It was never used in East Asian ceramics. Tin oxide is still valued in glazes as both an opacifier and as a white colorant. Tin oxide has long been used to produce a white, opaque and glossy glaze. As well as an opacifying agent, tin oxide also finds use as a colour stabiliser in some pigments and glazes. Minor quantities are also used in the conducting phases in some electrical porcelain glazes.

== History ==
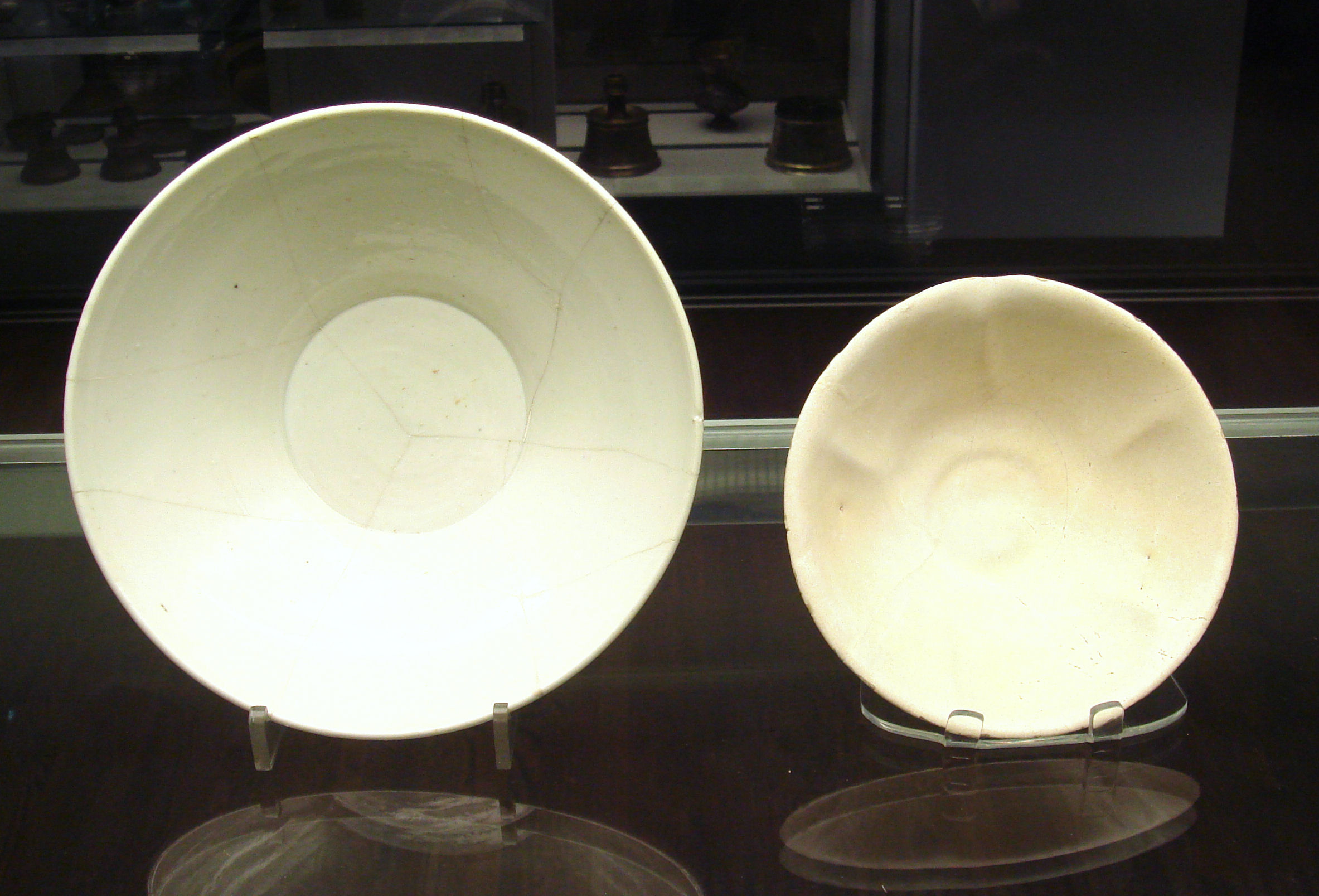
Chinese porcelain white ware bowl, not tin-glazed (left), found in Iran, and Iraqi tin-glazed earthenware bowl (right) found in Iraq, both 9th–10th century. British Museum.

The earliest tin-glazed pottery appears to have been made in Abbasid Iraq (750–1258) in the 8th century, fragments having been excavated during the First World War from the palace of Samarra about fifty miles north of Baghdad. From Mesopotamia, tin glazes spread to Islamic Egypt (868–905) during the 10th century, and then to Andalusian Spain (711–1492), leading to the maximum development of Islamic lusterware.

The history of tin glazes in the Islamic world is disputed. One possible reason for the earlier production of tin-glazed wares could be attributed to the trade between the Abbasid Empire and ancient China from the 8th to 9th century onwards, resulting in imitation of white Chinese stoneware by local Islamic potters. Another might be local glaze-making rather than foreign influence, supported by the similarity between the chemical and microstructural features of pre-Islamic white opaque glazes and that on the first tin-opacified wares

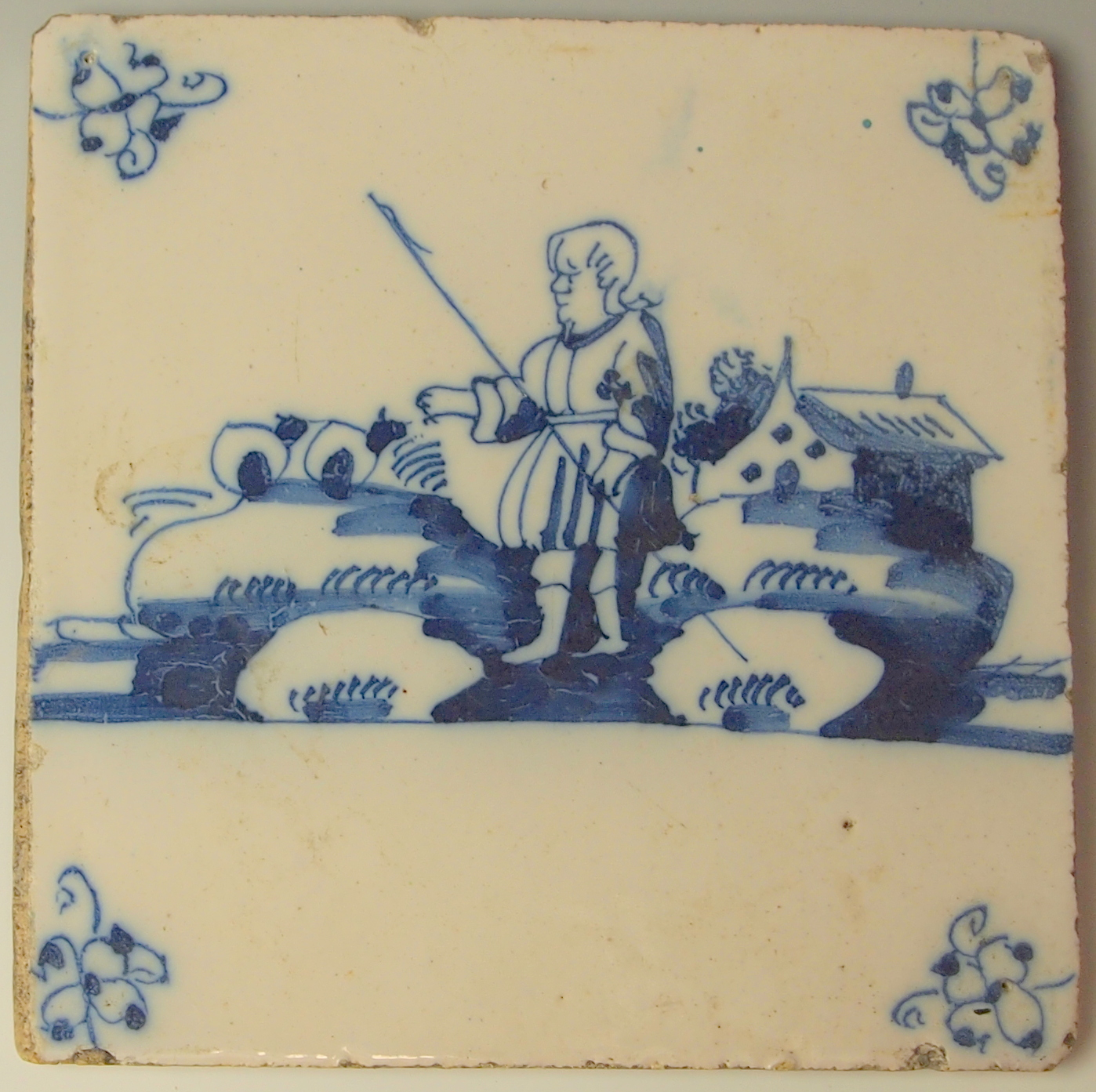
Dutch delftware tin-glazed tile

From the Middle East, tin-glaze spread through the Islamic world to Spain. In the 13th century, tin glazes reached Italy, where the earliest recorded reference to their use is in the 1330s, resulting in the emergence of Italian Maiolica. Amongst others, Luca della Robbia, born in Florence about 1400, used tin oxide as an opacifier in glazes. Potters began to draw polychrome paintings on the white opaque surface with metallic oxides such as cobalt oxide and to produce lustreware. The off-white fired body of Delftware and English Majolica was made to appear white, and hence mimic the appearance of Chinese porcelain, by the application of a glaze opacified and coloured white by the addition of tin oxide.

By the late 18th century the reduction in the price of porcelain, and the new English creamwares and related types, stronger, lighter and often cheaper than traditional earthenwares, hit the production of tin-glazed wares very hard, and production of "useful" rather than decorative wares almost ceased, so that "by 1850 the industry was almost extinct" in France. In 1947 Arthur Lane wrote it was "now only [made in Europe] in a few places to provide the tourist with souvenirs"

=== Manufacturing process and colours ===
Though the recipe of tin glazes may differ in different sites and periods, the process of the production of tin glazes is similar. Generally speaking, the first step of the production of tin glazes is to mix tin and lead in order to form oxides, which was then added to a glaze matrix (alkali-silicate glaze, for example) and heated. After the mixture cooled, the tin oxide crystallises as what has been mentioned above, therefore generates the so-called white tin-opacified glazes. Besides, the body of tin-opacified wares is generally calcareous clays containing 15-25% CaO, of which the thermal expansion coefficient is close to that of tin glazes, thus avoid crazing during the firing process. On the other hand, the calcareous clay fired in an oxidising atmosphere results in a buff colour, thus lower the concentration of tin oxide used

The white opaque surface makes tin glaze a good base for painted decoration. The decoration is applied as metallic oxides, most commonly cobalt oxide for blue, copper oxide for green, iron oxide for brown, manganese dioxide for purple-brown and antimony for yellow. Late Italian maiolica blended oxides to produce detailed and realistic polychrome paintings, called istoriato. To these oxides modern potters are able to add powdered ceramic colours made from combinations of oxide, sometimes fritted. In the sixteenth century, the use of subtle and blended colours which were not strong enough to penetrate the opaque glaze made the delicate control of tonal values possible, and the painting therefore had to be done on the glaze surface, which then becomes a common manner of painting on tin-glazed wares.

This method was used until the 18th century, and is often called by the French name grand feu in English. The wares were fired twice, firstly just the clay body, then again after the glaze and painted colours were added. The colours applied on top of the glaze blended into it during firing (the technique thereby differing from underglaze painting used with transparent glazes). The disadvantage was that only a narrow group of pigments produced good colours after firing at the relatively high temperatures of up to 1,000 °C (1,800 °F). These included cobalt blue, manganese dark purple, copper green, antimony yellow, and the very tricky iron reds and brown, which only some potters were able to make as a good red.

In the 18th century overglaze enamels began to be used in the same way as on porcelain; this technique is often called petit feu in English when talking about faience (the Italian name is piccolo fuoco). A much wider range of colours was possible, but after the fired and glazed wares were painted a third firing was required, at a lower temperature of perhaps 750 and 850 °C (1,400 and 1,600 °F).

In modern versions, the pottery vessels are biscuit fired, usually between 900 and 1,000 °C (1,700 and 1,800 °F). The fired vessel is dipped in a liquid glaze suspension which sticks to it, leaving a smooth and absorbent surface when dry. On this surface colours are applied by brush, the colours made from powered oxides mixed with water to a consistency of water-colour paint, sometimes with the addition of a binding agent such as gum arabic. The unfired glaze absorbs the pigment like fresco, making errors difficult to correct but preserving the brilliant colors of the oxides when fired. The glazed and decorated vessels are returned to the kiln for a second firing, usually between 1000 and 1120 °C (the higher temperatures used by modern potters). Lustered wares have a third firing at a lower temperature, necessitating a delicate control of the amount of oxygen in the kiln atmosphere and therefore a flame-burning kiln.

Traditional kilns were wood firing, which required the pots to be protected in the glaze and luster firings by saggars or to be fired in a muffle kiln. Except for those making luster ware, modern tin-glaze potters use electric kilns.

The recrystallisation of tin oxide during the firing provides evidence of the slightly different methods of different production sites, as the crystal size, the distribution and the concentration may be influenced. For instance, the analysis of the 14th century Islamic tin glazes from eastern Spain indicates that these samples may be produced by non-fritting methods, as the heterogeneous distribution of tin oxides may be the remains of original grains of tin oxides.

The interaction between glaze and body also give clues to different handling and firing processes. As mentioned above, tin glaze suspension is applied to bisque or biscuit body made of calcareous clay with high content of calcium oxide. This could be inferred from the absence of trapped glaze bubbles. If it is applied to an unfired body, the calcium carbonate will decompose, generating carbon dioxide, the releasing of which from the body to the glaze results in trapped bubbles in the glaze layers.

=== Current use and alternatives ===
Tin oxide has been widely used as the opacifier in sanitaryware glazes. In this application, additions of up to 6% are reported to be used. The cost of tin oxide rose considerably during World War I (1914-1918), and resulted in a search for cheaper alternatives. The first successful replacement was zirconia and later zircon. Whilst zirconium compounds are not as effective, their low price led to a gradual increase in popularity with an associated reduction in use of tin oxide. Today, tin oxide finds limited use in glazes, generally its use is restricted to specialist low temperature applications, and by artisanal studio potters. The whiteness resulting from the use of zirconia has been described as more clinical than that from tin oxide, and is consequently preferred in some applications. The Koninklijke Tichelaar Makkum factory, or Royal Tichelaar Makkum, based in Makkum, Friesland continue the production Delftware using tin-glazed earthenware.

== Properties ==
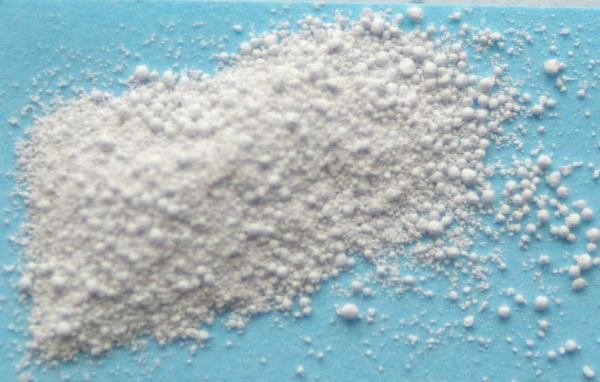
Tin dioxide, the raw ingredient in Tin-glazing.

Only one tin compound, tin(IV) oxide (SnO_{2}), also called stannic acid, is commercially exploited for tin glaze.

After firing, tin oxide remains in suspension in the vitreous matrix of the glaze. Because tin's high refractive index is different from the vitreous matrix, light is scattered: hence the opacity of tin glaze. Generally speaking, the more different the refractive index between the particles and the glaze matrix, the larger the opacity. Similarly, the closer the particle size to the light wavelength (100–1000 nm for visible light) and the more irregular the surface, the larger the degree of opacification.

The degree of dissolution increases with the firing temperature, and hence the extent of opacity diminishes. Although dependent on the other constituents the solubility of tin oxide in glaze melts is generally low. Its solubility is increased by Na_{2}O, K_{2}O and B_{2}O_{3}, and reduced by CaO, BaO, ZnO, Al_{2}O_{3}, and to a limited extent PbO.

Some research on medieval tin glaze has shown that the particle size of tin oxide which appears as cassiterite is around several hundred nanometers, which corresponds to the range of wavelength of visible light. In some cases, the tin oxide is presented not only as small crystals but also as aggregates of particles. These factors – the high refractive index, the low solubility in glazes and the particle size make tin oxide an excellent opacifier.

In the beginning of the use of tin oxide, it is mainly viewed as a slip layer between the glaze and ceramic body. This could be seen from the SEM photomicrographs of some earlier Islamic glazed ceramics, of which the particles of tin oxide are concentrated at the interface, together with the existence of wollastonite, diopside and air bubble as other opacifiers. The microanalysis of later tin glazes reveals the distribution of tin oxide through the glazes rather than just at the interface, which indicates that tin oxide is really acting as an opacifier instead of only a surface coating layer.

Lead is usually brought into the glazes with tin oxide. The reaction between lead and tin oxide results in the recrystallisation of tin oxide, and thus enhances the degree of opacification in tin-opacified glazes than in tin-opacified glass. A high PbO/SnO_{2} ratio is often found in ancient glazes. During the firing process, lead oxide reacts with quartz at approximately 550 °C to form PbSiO_{3}, which then reacts with tin oxide to produce lead-tin oxide (PbSnO_{3}) at a temperature higher than 600 °C. After the formation of lead-tin oxide, the melting of PbSiO_{3}, PbO and PbSnO_{3} occurs at the temperature in the range of 700 °C to 750 °C, resulting in the dissolution of PbSnO_{3} to SnO_{2}. The degree of the crystallisation of SnO_{2} increases with the increasing of temperature. During either heating or cooling, the recrystallisation is taken place until the supply of tin is exhausted. In the second heating, lead in the form of lead oxide no longer reacts with tin oxide to form lead silicate, thus the recrystallised cassiterite (SnO_{2}) remain undissolved and precipitate in the glazes. The nucleation and growth rates of the precipitation depend upon temperature and time. The particle size of the cassiterite developed is also dependent on the temperature, and smaller than that used in the very beginning. It is the smaller particle size of the recrystallised SnO_{2} in glazes that increases the opacity in tin-opacified glazes. Besides the increasing the opacity, the high lead oxide to tin oxide ratio also reduces the melting point of glazes, lead to a lower firing temperature during production.

== Composition ==
=== Analyses and recipes ===
The earliest Middle Eastern tin glazes used calcium, lead and sodium compounds as fluxes in combination with the silica in silica. An Islamic opaque white glaze has been analysed, and is quoted below as a Seger formula:

- PbO=0.32
- CaO=0.32
- K_{2}O=0.03
- Na_{2}O=0.29
- MgO=0.04
- Al_{2}O_{3}=0.03
- SiO_{2}=1.73
- SnO_{2}=0.07

In this recipe, the addition of alkali helps to increase the hardness of the surface and clarify the colour of the glaze as well. With the development of tin glazes, the significant amount of tin oxide indicates its deliberate addition as an opacifier. A recipe involving the use of three ingredients was given in Abu’l-Qasim’s treatise from Persia in the 14th century: a glass-frit of quartz and potash, a lead-tin calx and a calcination of limestone and quartz. Afterwards, with the spread of tin glazes, lead gradually became the principal background in tin glazes, though a small proportion of alkali was still introduced in order to increase the fusibility. No specific recipes alluding to tin glazes in Spain have been found in ancient archives. However, recent research has shown that, at least since the 10th century AD, most Islamic white glazes in Spain were lead-silica glazes with tin oxide as an opacifier. That is, no alkaline glazes or lead-alkaline glazes have been found. Piccolpasso recorded several glazes used in Italy in the 1550s, all variations of lead, tin, lime, soda and potash glazes. It is believed early Spanish glazes were similar.

A Seger analysis of a tin glaze from the early 20th century is:

- PbO=0.52
- CaO=0.16
- K_{2}O=0.03
- Na_{2}O=0.29
- Al_{2}O_{3}=0.15
- SiO_{2}=2.77
- SnO_{2}=0.23

A more recent recipe is:

- Lead bisilicate frit: 74%
- China clay: 10%
- Whiting: 2%
- Flint, calcined: 4%
- Tin oxide: 10%

And another is:

- Potassium feldspar: 65%
- Limestone: 11%
- Silica: 11%
- Zinc oxide: 9%
- Tin oxide: 4%

=== As a glaze colorant ===
In combination with chromium compounds addition of 0.5–1.5% tin oxide to a glaze result in a pink colour, with such glazes being known as Chrome-tin pinks. In conjunction with small additions of zinc oxide and titanium oxide, additions of tin oxide up to 18% to lead glazes can produce a satin or vellum surface finish. The firing temperatures of such glazes are low, in the region of 950–1000 °C because of the variable degrees of solution of the individual oxides. The amount of tin oxide used for coloured glazes depends upon the opacifying property of the chosen chromophore and the intensity of the colour desired; if a deep colour is required less opacifier will be needed than for pastel shades.

== Bibliography ==
- al-Saad, Z. 2002. Chemical composition and manufacturing technology of a collection of various types of Islamic glazes excavated from Jordan. Journal of Archaeological Science 29:803-810.
- Allan, J. 1973. Abu'l-Qasim's treatise on ceramics. Iran 9:111-120.
- Borgia, I., B. Brunettu, A. Sgamellontti, F. Shokouhi, P. Oliaiy, J. Rahighi, M. Lamehi-rachti, M. Mellini, and C. Viti. 2004. Characterisation of decorations on Iranian (10th–13th century) lustreware Applied Physics A 79 (257-261).
- Caiger-Smith, Alan, Tin-Glaze Pottery in Europe and the Islamic World: The Tradition of 1000 Years in Maiolica, Faience and Delftware (Faber and Faber, 1973) ISBN 0-571-09349-3
- Caiger-Smith, Alan, Lustre Pottery: Technique, Tradition and Innovation in Islam and the Western World (Faber and Faber, 1985) ISBN 0-571-13507-2
- Canby, S. R. 1997. "Islamic lustreware". In Pottery in the making: world ceramic traditions, edited by I. Freestone and D. Gaimster. London: British Museum Press.
- Coutts, Howard, The Art of Ceramics: European Ceramic Design, 1500–1830, 2001, Yale University Press, ISBN 0300083874, 9780300083873, google books
- Harris, David, Guide To Looking At Italian Ceramics (J. Paul Getty Museum in association with British Museum Press, 1993)
- Kleimann, B. 1986. History and development of early Islamic pottery glazes. In Proceedings of the 24th international archaeometry symposium, edited by J. S. Olin and M. J. Blackman. Washington DC: Smithsonian Institution Press.
- Lane, Arthur, French Faïence, 1948, Faber & Faber
- Mason, R. B., and M. S. Tite. 1997. "The beginnings of tin-opacification of pottery glazes". Archaeometry 39:41-58.
- McNab, Jessie, Seventeenth-Century French Ceramic Art, 1987, Metropolitan Museum of Art, ISBN 0870994905, 9780870994906, google books
- Molera, J., T. Pradell, N. Salvadó, and M. Vendrell-Saz. 1999. "Evidence of Tin Oxide Recrystallization in Opacified Lead Glazes". Journal of American Ceramic Society 82:2871-2875.
- Molera, J., M. Vendrell-Saz, and J. Pérez-Arantegui. 2001. "Chemical and textural characterization of tin glazes in Islamic ceramics from eastern Spain". Journal of Archaeological Science 28:331-340.
- Moon, Iris, "French Faience", in Heilbrunn Timeline of Art History, 2016, New York: The Metropolitan Museum of Art, online
- Piccolpasso, Cipriano, The Three Books of the Potter's Art (trans. A.Caiger Smith and R.Lightbown) (Scolar Press, 1980) ISBN 0-85967-452-5
- Ravaglioli, A., A. Keajewski, M. S. Tite, R. R. Burn, P. A. Simpson, and G. C. Bojani. 1996. A physico-chemical study on some glazes coming from Romagna's and Neaples's Moiolica. Fraenza 82:18-29.
- Savage, George, Pottery Through the Ages, Penguin, 1959
- Tite, M. S. 1991. "Technological investigations of Italian Renaissance ceramics". In Italian Renaissance pottery: papers written in association with a colloqium at the British Museum, edited by T. Wilson. London: British Museum Publications.
- Tite, M. S., I. Freestone, and R. B. Manson. 1998. "Lead glazes in antiquity - methods of production and reasons for use". archaeometry 40:241-260.
- Tite, M. S., T. Pradell, and A. Shortland. 2008. Discovery, production and use of tin-based opacifiers in glasses, enamels and glazes from the late Iron Age onwards: a reassessment. Journal of Archaeological Science 50:67-84.
- Varella, Evangelia A., Conservation Science for the Cultural Heritage: Applications of Instrumental Analysis, 2012, Springer Science & Business Media, ISBN 3642309852, 9783642309854, google books
- Vendrell, M., J. Molera, and M. S. Tite. 2000. Optical properties of tin-opacified glazes. Archaeometry 42:325-340.
