= Decoration =

Decoration may refer to:

- Decorative arts
- A house painter and decorator's craft
- An act or object intended to increase the beauty of a person, room, etc.

== Art ==
- Cake decorating, the art of making a cake visually interesting
- Christmas decoration, festive decorations used at Christmas time
- Decorations (John Ireland), a set of three pieces for piano solo composed in 1912–13 by John Ireland
- In-glaze decoration, a method of decorating ceramics - decoration applied before firing
  - On-glaze decoration, a method of decorating ceramics - decoration applied after glazing
- In-mould decoration, a method of decorating moulded plastics
- Interior design, the internal finishing of a building

== Computing ==
- Decorator pattern, a design pattern used in object-oriented programming
- Link decoration, the style of visual appearance of hyperlinks
- Name decoration, a technique used in most programming languages
- Syntax decoration, a form of enriched text presentation or syntax highlighting
- Text decoration, text attribution with styles like italics, boldface, underlines
- USB decoration, a decorative device that uses the Universal Serial Bus connector
- Window decoration, in computing are the window's visual elements drawn by a window manager

== Other uses ==
- State decoration, an object such as a medal or insignia that is awarded to certain people
- Web decoration, conspicuous silk structure in the webs of some spiders

== See also ==
- Adornment
- Decorator (disambiguation)
- Decorate (disambiguation)
