= In-glaze decoration =

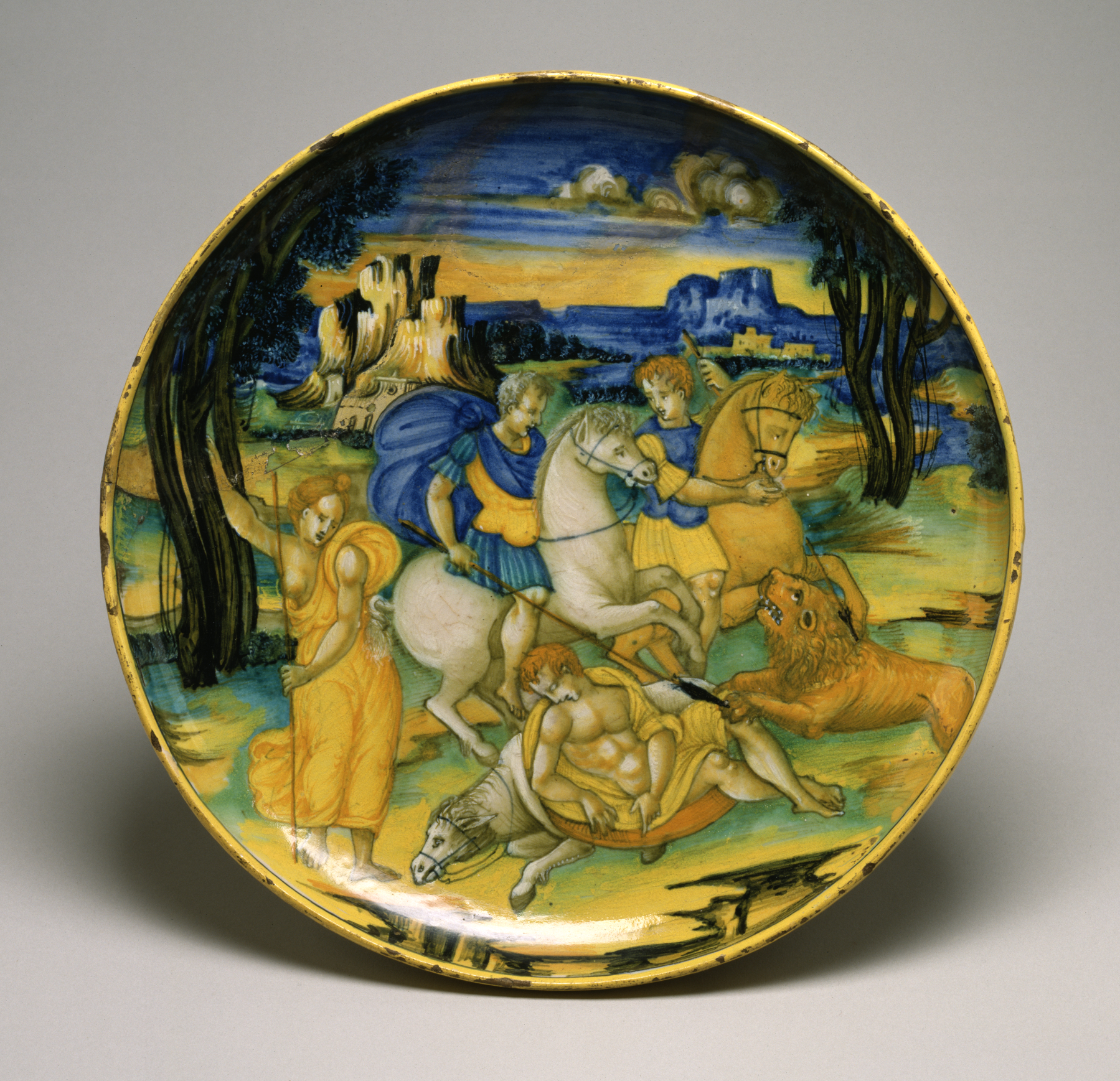
Italian Renaissance maiolica, Faenza, istoriato ware by Baldassare Manara, after Giovanni Antonio da Brescia, c 1520 -47

In-glaze or inglaze is a method of decorating pottery, where the materials used allow painted decoration to be applied on the surface of the glaze before the glost firing so that it fuses into the glaze in the course of firing.

It contrasts with the other main methods of adding painted colours to pottery. These are underglaze painting, where the paint is applied before the glaze, which then seals it, and overglaze decoration where the painting is done in enamels after the glazed vessel has been fired, before a second lighter firing to fuse it to the glaze. There is also the use of coloured glazes, which often carry painted designs.

As with underglaze, in-glaze requires pigments that can withstand the high temperatures of the main firing without discolouring. Historically this was a small group. Inglaze works well with tin-glazed pottery, as unlike lead glaze the glaze does not become runny in the course of firing.

== Faience ==
The very wide range of types of European tin-glazed earthenware or "faience" all began using in-glaze or underglaze painting, with overglaze enamels only developing in the 18th century. In French faience, the in-glaze technique is known as grand feu ("big fire") and the one using enamels as petit feu ("little fire"). Most styles in this group, such as Delftware, mostly used blue and white pottery decoration, but Italian maiolica was fully polychrome, using the range of in- and underglaze colours available.
