= Ceramic glaze =

Fused coating on ceramic objects

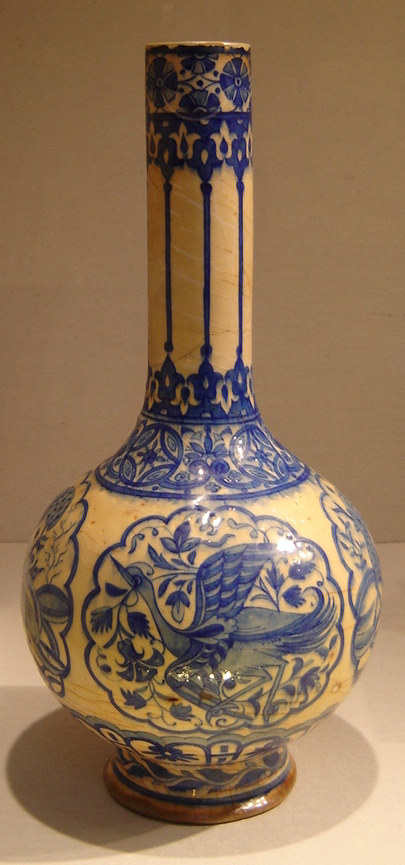
Composite body, painted, and glazed bottle. Iran, 16th century (Metropolitan Museum of Art)

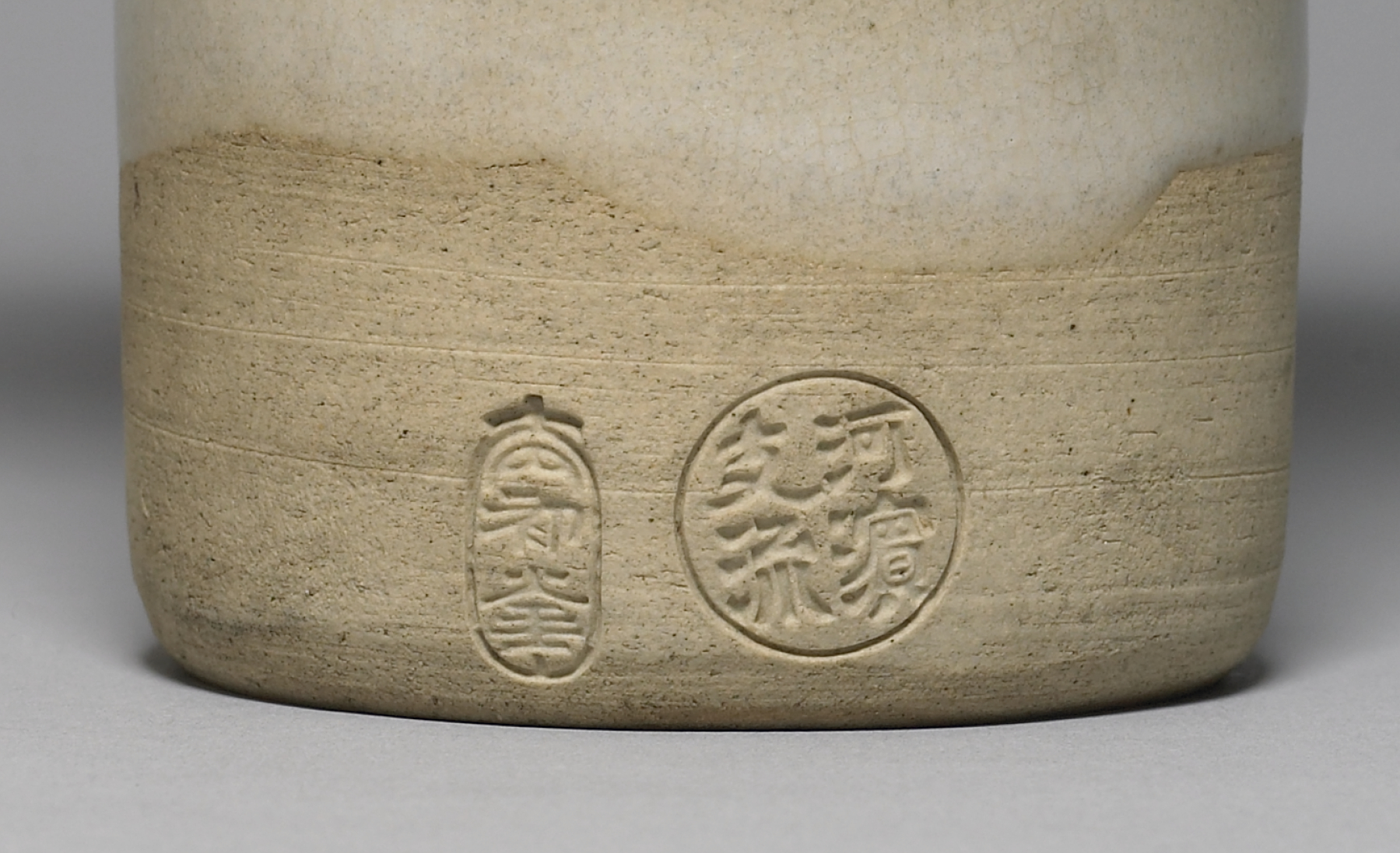
Detail of dripping rice-straw ash glaze (top), Japan, 1852

Ceramic glaze, or simply glaze, is a glassy coating on ceramics. It is used for decoration, to ensure the item is impermeable to liquids and to minimize the adherence of pollutants.

Glazing renders earthenware impermeable to water, sealing the inherent porosity of earthenware. It also gives a tougher surface. Glaze is also used on stoneware and porcelain. In addition to their functionality, glazes can form a variety of surface finishes, including degrees of glossy or matte finish and color. Glazes may also enhance the underlying design or texture either unmodified or inscribed, carved or painted.

Most pottery produced in recent centuries has been glazed, other than pieces in bisque porcelain. Tiles are often glazed on the surface face, and modern architectural terracotta is often glazed. Glazed brick is also common. Sanitaryware is invariably glazed, as are many ceramics used in industry, for example ceramic insulators for overhead power lines.

The most important groups of traditional glazes, each named after its main ceramic fluxing agent, are:

- Ash glaze, traditionally important in East Asia, simply made from wood or plant ash, which contains potash and lime.
- Feldspathic glazes of porcelain.
- Lead glazes, plain or coloured, are glossy and transparent after firing, which need only about 800 °C (1,470 °F). They have been used for about 2,000 years in China e.g. sancai, around the Mediterranean, and in Europe e.g. Victorian majolica.
- Salt-glaze, mostly European stoneware. It uses ordinary salt.
- Tin-glaze, which coats the ware with lead glaze made opaque white by the addition of tin. Known in the ancient Near East and then important in Islamic pottery, from which it passed to Europe. Includes Hispano-Moresque ware, Italian Renaissance maiolica (also called majolica), faience and Delftware.

Glaze may be applied by spraying, dipping, trailing or brushing on an aqueous suspension of the unfired glaze. The colour of a glaze after it has been fired may be significantly different from before firing. To prevent glazed wares sticking to kiln furniture during firing, either a small part of the object being fired (for example, the foot) is left unglazed or, alternatively, special refractory "spurs" are used as supports. These are removed and discarded after the firing.

== History ==
Historically, glazing of ceramics developed rather slowly, as appropriate materials needed to be discovered, and also firing technology able to reliably reach the necessary temperatures was needed. Glazes first appeared on stone materials in the 4th millennium BC, and Ancient Egyptian faience (fritware rather than a clay-based material) was self-glazing, as the material naturally formed a glaze-like layer during firing. Glazing of pottery followed the invention of glass around 1500 BC, in the Middle East and Egypt with alkali glazes including ash glaze, and in China, using ground feldspar. By around 100 BC lead-glazing was widespread in the Old World.

Glazed brick goes back to the Elamite Temple at Chogha Zanbil, dated to the 13th century BC. The Iron Pagoda, built in 1049 in Kaifeng, China, of glazed bricks is a well-known later example.

Lead glazed earthenware was probably made in China during the Warring States period (475 – 221 BC), and its production increased during the Han dynasty. High temperature proto-celadon glazed stoneware was made earlier than glazed earthenware, since the Shang dynasty (1600 – 1046 BCE).

During the Kofun period of Japan, Sue ware was decorated with greenish natural ash glazes. From 552 to 794 AD, differently colored glazes were introduced. The three colored glazes of the Tang dynasty were frequently used for a period, but were gradually phased out; the precise colors and compositions of the glazes have not been recovered. Natural ash glaze, however, was commonly used throughout the country.

In the 13th century, flower designs were painted with red, blue, green, yellow and black overglazes. Overglazes became very popular because of the particular look they gave ceramics.

From the eighth century, the use of glazed ceramics was prevalent in Islamic art and Islamic pottery, usually in the form of elaborate pottery. Tin-opacified glazing was one of the earliest new technologies developed by the Islamic potters. The first Islamic opaque glazes can be found as blue-painted ware in Basra, dating to around the 8th century. Another significant contribution was the development of stoneware, originating from 9th century Iraq. Other places for innovative pottery in the Islamic world included Fustat (from 975 to 1075), Damascus (from 1100 to around 1600) and Tabriz (from 1470 to 1550).

== Composition ==
Raw materials for ceramic glazes generally include silica, which will be the main glass former. Various metal oxides, such as those of sodium, potassium and calcium, act as flux and therefore lower the melting temperature. Alumina, often derived from clay, stiffens the molten glaze to prevent it from running off the piece. Colorants, such as iron oxide, copper carbonate or cobalt carbonate, and sometimes opacifiers including tin oxide and zirconium oxide, are used to modify the visual appearance of the fired glaze.

Glazes need to include a ceramic flux which functions by promoting partial liquefaction in the clay bodies and the other glaze materials. Fluxes lower the high melting point of the glass forms silica, and sometimes boron trioxide.

Salt glazing is a vapor-glazing process where salt or soda ash is introduced into a high-temperature kiln. The resulting sodium vapor reacts with the alumina and silica in the clay body, forming a durable sodium-silicate glass coating. Though historically significant, the method is now largely obsolete due to the release of toxic hydrogen chloride gas and other environmental concerns.

== Process ==
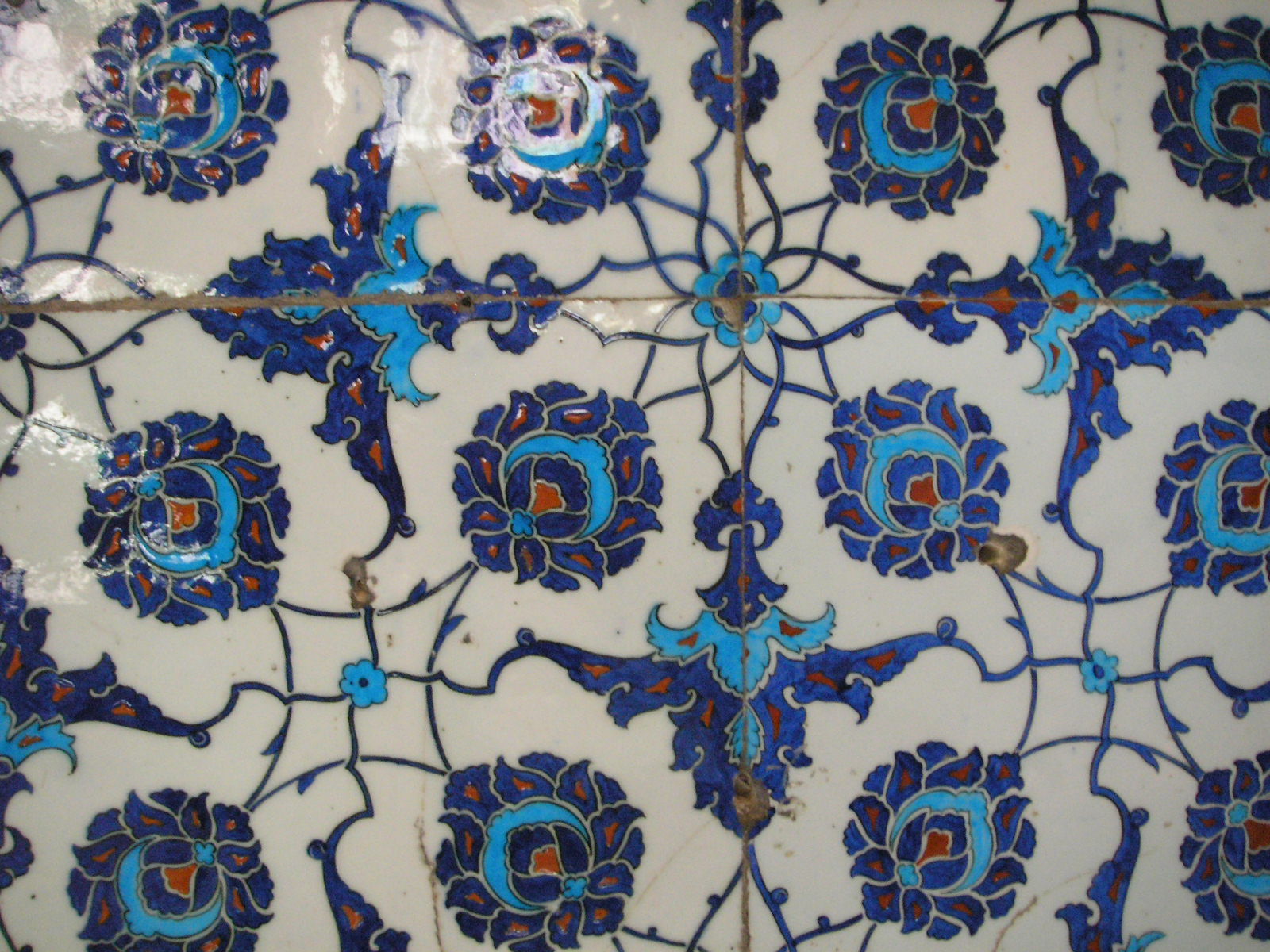
İznik tiles in the Enderûn Library, Topkapi Palace, Istanbul

=== Production ===
Preparation begins with the comminution of the raw materials by milling, such as by a ball mill, jet mill and vibro-energy mill, to achieve a specific particle size distribution; this ensures a homogeneous melt during the later firing process and a smooth surface finish. The resulting mixture is then suspended in water with the addition of electrolytes to form a stable slurry or slip that can be applied to the ceramic substrate via dipping, spraying or curtain coating.

While many glazes incorporate raw minerals such as feldspar, quartz and kaolin, some formulations use frit. In the production of frit, raw materials are first melted into a glass and then rapidly quenched in water to form shattered droplets, which are then re-ground; this pre-reacts the components and renders toxic or soluble materials safe and stable for the final glaze However, many glazes do not contain frit, relying instead on a precise balance of raw un-melted minerals that react during the final kiln firing to form the protective glass layer. The choice between raw and fritted glazes is typically dictated by the required firing temperature, the solubility of the necessary chemicals and the desired thermal expansion of the finished surface.

=== Application ===
Glaze application methods are selected based on the desired finish and the specific geometry of the ceramic form. While many processes involve applying glaze to biscuit-fired ware to take advantage of its high porosity and structural strength, techniques are also adapted for greenware in a process known as once-firing. Dipping involves submerging a piece into a large vat for a few seconds to achieve a perfectly even, professional-grade coating. For more controlled or multi-coloured decorative work, brushing allows for the layering of different pigments, though multiple coats are necessary to ensure the finish remains opaque. Pouring is the standard technique for coating the interiors of narrow-necked vessels or creating intentional drip effects on the exterior surface. For large-scale articles or smooth gradients, spraying with an airbrush or automated spray booth provides a fine, atomised mist that builds up colour gradually. Finally, more tactile techniques like sponging and splattered application can be used to introduce organic textures and speckled patterns to the surface.

In high-volume manufacturing, spraying is the dominant technique due to its superior efficiency, precision, and ease of automation. Unlike dipping or pouring, which require significant volumes of standing liquid glaze, spraying allows for a thinner, more controlled application that reduces material waste. The use of electrostatic spray systems further ensures that the atomised glaze particles are attracted uniformly to the ceramic surface, including complex recesses, resulting in a consistent finish across thousands of identical articles. This mechanical repeatability is essential for maintaining rigorous quality control standards while minimising the manual labour and drying time associated with other methods.

The adhesion of the glaze is dependent on the porosity and moisture content of the body, whether it is in a green or biscuit state. Regardless of the method employed, the base or "foot" of the object must remain free of glaze—achieved either through manual removal or the application of a wax resist—to prevent the vitrifying silicate from fusing the piece to the kiln furniture during the firing process.

A functional variant incorporates rare earth composite antimicrobial compounds into ceramic glaze prior to high-temperature sintering. The resulting surface exhibits durable antimicrobial properties attributed to the disruption of bacterial cell membranes by rare-earth elements' 4f electron configuration. Unlike surface-applied antimicrobial coatings, the properties are retained as the material bonds with the glaze matrix during firing. This technology has been covered in independent science media.

=== Firing ===
Whether whiteware is glazed after a preliminary firing or via a once-firing (raw glazing) process, the kiln transformation remains the critical final stage in ceramic production. In a once-firing scenario, the glaze is applied directly to the bone-dry, unfired clay body, requiring the substrate and the coating to mature simultaneously. As the temperature inside the kiln rises, the raw glaze materials melt and fuse, chemically reacting with the clay body to form a thin, impermeable layer of glass. This process not only seals the porous surface, making it functional for liquids and food, but also develops the final aesthetic, whether it be a brilliant high-gloss, a soft matte or a vibrant colour.

The chemical transition is complex; as the kiln reaches its peak temperature, the glaze components reach a eutectic point where they become a molten liquid. During this liquid phase, the glaze "heals" over the surface, smoothing out imperfections and eliminating porosity. This transition transforms the fragile, dry article into a dense, vitrified product. As the kiln is slowly cooled, the glass transitions from a viscous state back into a solid, creating a permanent, scratch-resistant bond with the fired ceramic substrate that reveals the true depth of the underlying design.

== Colour and decoration ==
Underglaze decoration is applied before the glaze, usually to unfired pottery ("raw" or "greenware") but sometimes to "biscuit"-fired (an initial firing of some articles before the glazing and re-firing). A wet glaze—usually transparent—is applied over the decoration. The pigment fuses with the glaze, and appears to be underneath a layer of clear glaze; generally the body material used fires to a whitish colour. The best known type of underglaze decoration is the blue and white porcelain first produced in China, and then copied in other countries. The striking blue color uses cobalt as cobalt oxide or cobalt carbonate. However many of the imitative types, such as Delftware, have off-white or even brown earthenware bodies, which are given a white tin-glaze and either inglaze or overglaze decoration. With the English invention of creamware and other white-bodied earthenwares in the 18th century, underglaze decoration became widely used on earthenware as well as porcelain.

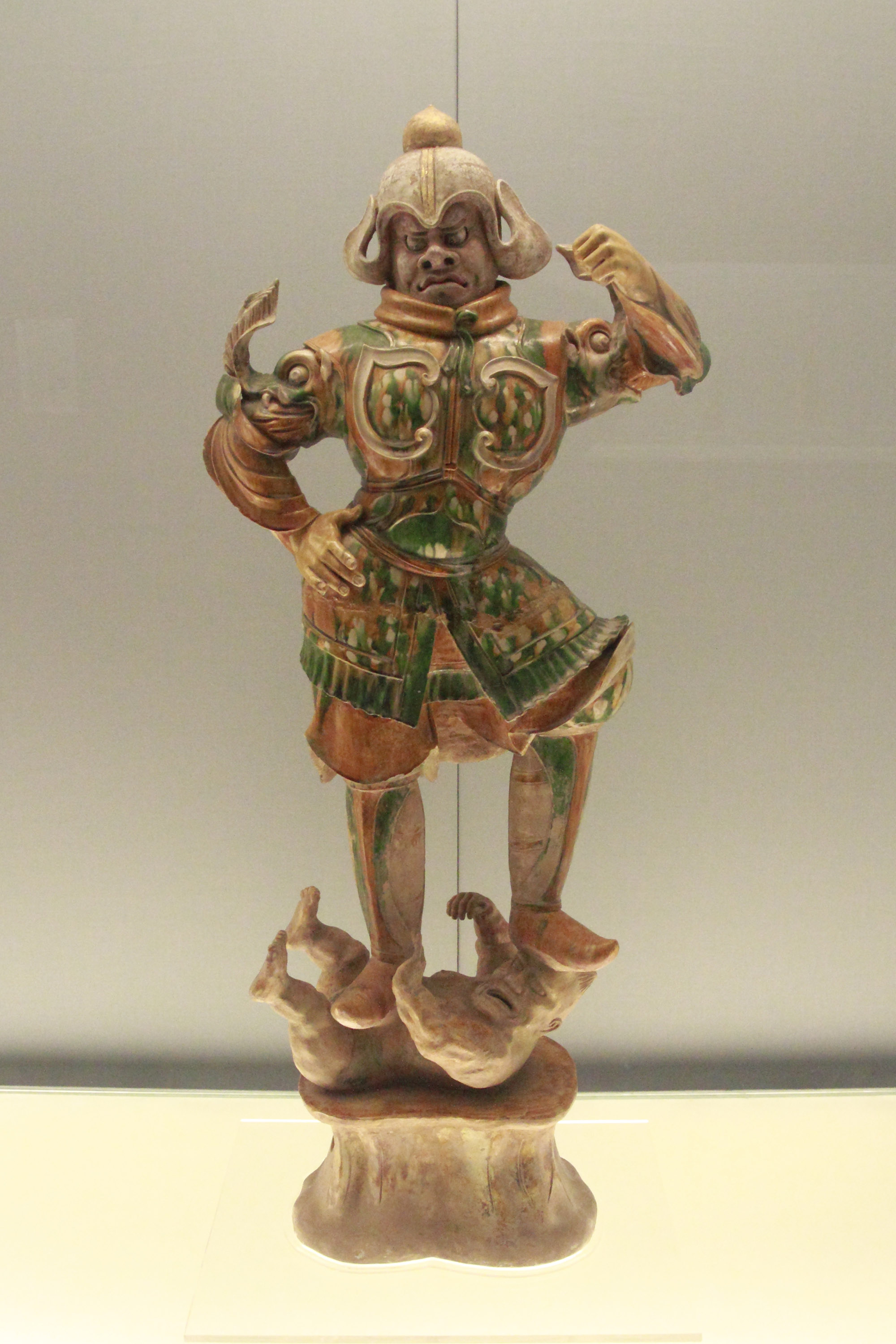
Sancai lead-glazes in a Tang dynasty tomb guardian

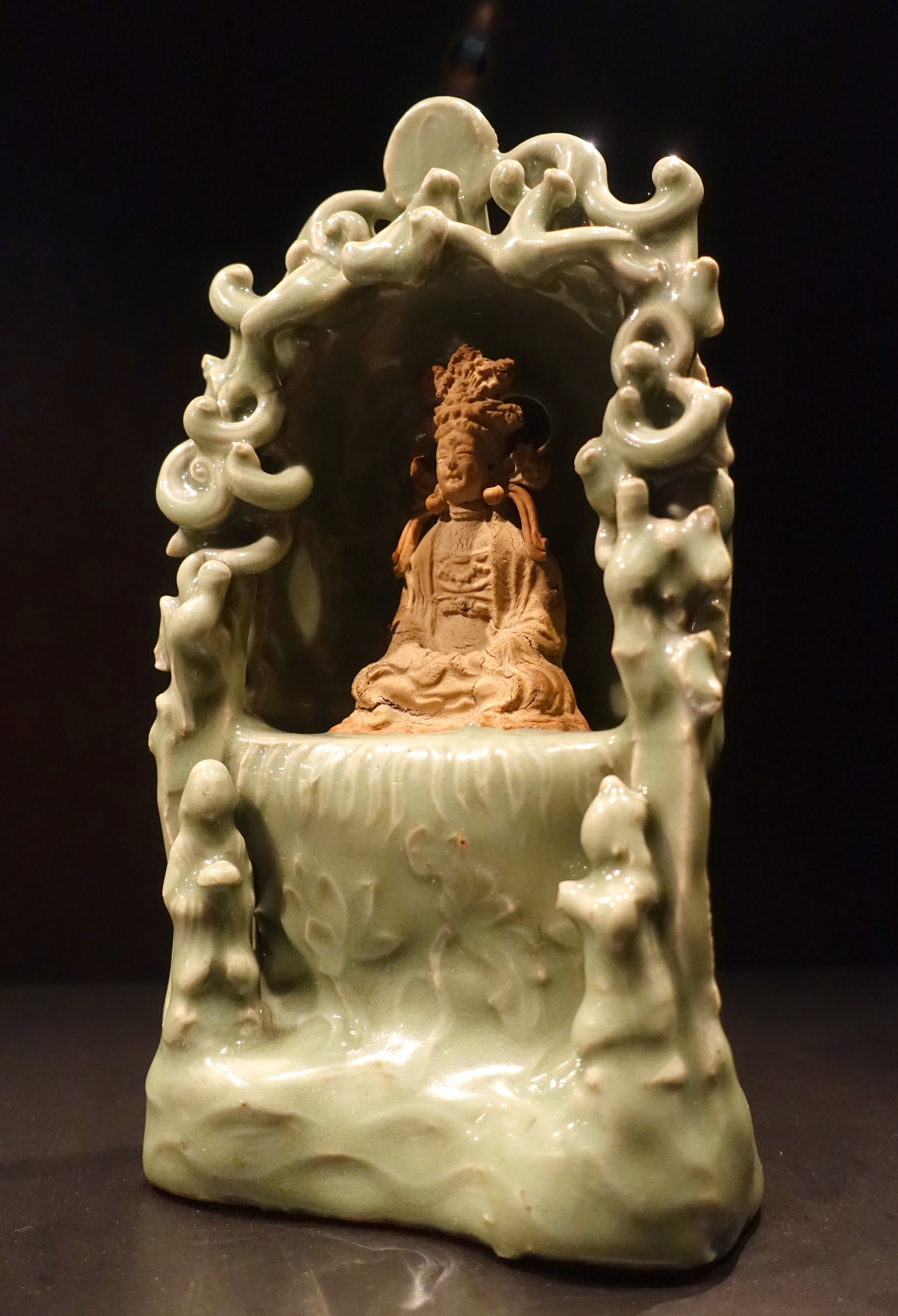
Chinese celadon shrine; coloured glaze, with the figure left unglazed. Ming dynasty, 1300-1400

Overglaze decoration is applied on top of a fired layer of glaze, and generally uses colours in "enamel", essentially glass, which require a second firing at a relatively low temperature to fuse them with the glaze. Because it is only fired at a relatively low temperature, a wider range of pigments could be used in historic periods. Overglaze colors are low-temperature glazes that give ceramics a more decorative, glassy look. A piece is fired first, this initial firing being called the glost firing, then the overglaze decoration is applied, and it is fired again. Once the piece is fired and comes out of the kiln, its texture is smoother due to the glaze.

Other methods are firstly inglaze, where the paints are applied onto the glaze before firing, and then become incorporated within the glaze layer during firing. This works well with tin-glazed pottery, such as maiolica, but the range of colours was limited to those that could withstand a glost firing, as with underglaze. Coloured glazes, where the pigments are mixed into the liquid glaze before it is applied to the pottery, are mostly used to give a single colour to a whole piece, as in most celadons, but can also be used to create designs in contrasting colours, as in Chinese sancai ("three-colour") wares, or even painted scenes.

Many historical styles, for example Japanese Imari ware, Chinese doucai and wucai, combine the different types of decoration. In such cases the first firing for the body, any underglaze decoration and glaze is typically followed by a second firing after the overglaze enamels have been applied.

== Lead and cadmium leaching ==
The leaching of lead (Pb) and cadmium (Cd) from glazes can be a public health concern. These heavy metals have historically been used as fluxes to create smooth, high-gloss finishes at low temperatures or to provide specific chemical stability. However, if a glaze is improperly formulated or fired, its chemical structure may remain unstable. When such ceramics come into contact with acidic substances—such as citrus juice or coffee—the acid can attack the glaze matrix, releasing metal ions into the food or drink.

Ingestion risks are cumulative and severe. Lead is a potent neurotoxin linked to developmental delays and cardiovascular issues, while cadmium is a carcinogen that can cause renal failure over prolonged exposure. Consequently, international bodies such as the ISO enforce strict permissible limits for metal release. Modern scientific developments in ceramic chemistry, including the use of fritted materials and computer-aided oxide balancing, have significantly improved glaze stability. As a result, products from reputable manufacturers that adhere to contemporary safety standards are safe for functional use. Despite these advancements, risks persist in artisanal pottery with poor oversight and antique ceramics where the chemical bond is insufficient to prevent leaching.

== Environmental impact ==
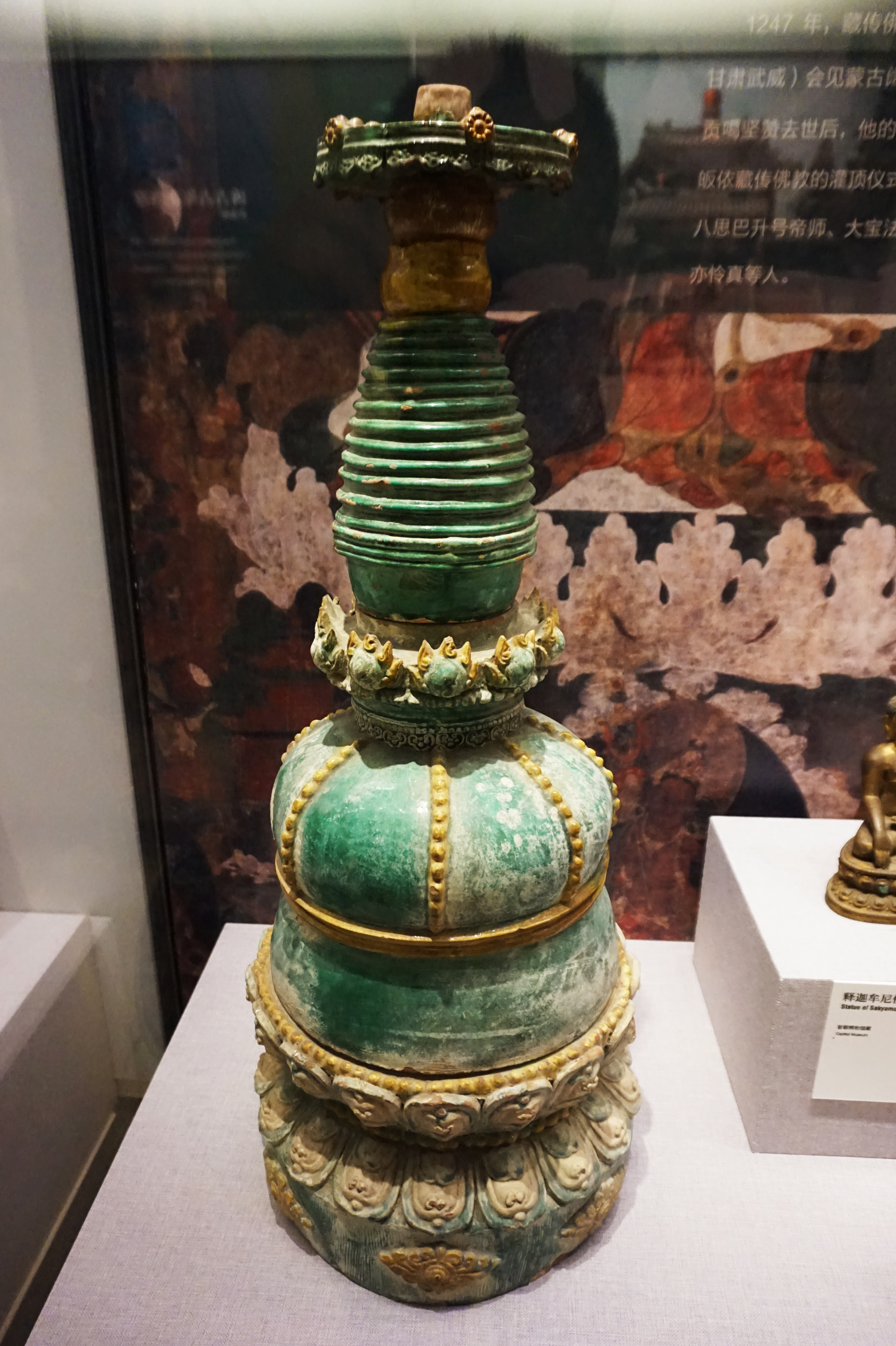
Glazed stupa model, Yuan dynasty

Beyond the health concerns of heavy metal leaching, ceramic glazes present significant environmental challenges during the manufacturing and disposal stages. The extraction of raw materials, such as lithium, cobalt, and barium, often involves energy-intensive mining processes that can lead to habitat destruction and soil erosion.

Furthermore, during the firing process in kilns, volatile compounds and greenhouse gases—including fluorine and sulphur oxides—can be released into the atmosphere if proper filtration systems are not utilised.

The management of waste glaze is equally critical; liquid glaze runoff containing heavy metals can contaminate groundwater and local ecosystems if discarded into standard drainage systems without prior wastewater treatment. As a result, modern studios and factories are increasingly adopting "closed-loop" systems to reclaim glaze sediment and reduce the ecological footprint of ceramic production.

== Metal oxides in glazes ==
Metals used in ceramic glazes are typically in the form of metal oxides.

=== Lead(II) oxide ===
Ceramic manufacturers primarily use lead(II) oxide (PbO) as a flux for its low melting range, wide firing range, low surface tension, high index of refraction, and resistance to devitrification. Lead used in the manufacture of commercial glazes are molecularly bound to silica in a 1:1 ratio, or included in frit form, to ensure stabilization and reduce the risk of leaching.

In polluted environments, nitrogen dioxide reacts with water (H_{2}O) to produce nitrous acid (HNO_{2}) and nitric acid (HNO_{3}).

H_{2}O + 2NO_{2} → HNO_{2} + HNO_{3}

Soluble Lead(II) nitrate (Pb(NO_{3})_{2}) forms when lead(II) oxide (PbO) of leaded glazes is exposed to nitric acid (HNO_{3})

PbO + 2HNO_{3} → Pb(NO_{3})_{2} + H_{2}O

Because lead exposure is strongly linked to a variety of health problems, collectively referred to as lead poisoning, the disposal of leaded glass (chiefly in the form of discarded CRT displays) and lead-glazed ceramics is subject to toxic waste regulations.

=== Barium carbonate and strontium carbonate ===
Barium carbonate (BaCO_{3}) is used to create a unique glaze color known as barium blue. However, the ethical nature of using barium carbonate for glazes on food contact surfaces has come into question. Barium poisoning by ingestion can result in convulsions, paralysis, digestive discomfort, and death. It is also somewhat soluble in acid, and can contaminate water and soil for long periods of time. These concerns have led to attempts to substitute strontium carbonate (SrCO_{3}) in glazes that require barium carbonate. Unlike barium carbonate, strontium carbonate is not considered a safety hazard by the NIH. Experiments in strontium substitution tend to be successful in gloss type glazes, although there are some effects and colors produced in matte type glazes that can only be obtained through use of barium.

To reduce the likelihood of leaching, barium carbonate is used in frit form and bound to silica in a 1:1 ratio. It is also recommended that barium glazes not be used on food contact surfaces or outdoor items.

=== Chromium(III) oxide ===
Chromium(III) oxide (Cr_{2}O_{3}) is used as a colorant in ceramic glazes. Chromium(III) oxide can undergo a reaction with calcium oxide (CaO) and atmospheric oxygen in temperatures reached by a kiln to produce calcium chromate (CaCrO_{4}). The oxidation reaction changes chromium from its +3 oxidation state to its +6 oxidation state. Chromium(VI) is very soluble and the most mobile out of all the other stable forms of chromium.

Cr_{2}O_{3} + 2CaO + 3/2O_{2} → CaCrO_{4}

Chromium may enter water systems via industrial discharge. Chromium(VI) can enter the environment directly or oxidants present in soils can react with chromium(III) to produce chromium(VI). Plants have reduced amounts of chlorophyll when grown in the presence of chromium(VI).

Chromium oxidation during manufacturing processes can be reduced with the introduction of compounds that bind to calcium.

Uranium(IV) oxide (UO_{2})

Urania-based ceramic glazes are dark green or black when fired in a reduction or when UO_{2} is used; more commonly it is used in oxidation to produce bright yellow, orange and red glazes. Uranium glazes were used in the 1920s and 1930s for making uranium tile, watch, clock and aircraft dials.

Uranium dioxide is produced by reducing uranium trioxide with hydrogen.

UO_{3} + H_{2} → UO_{2} + H_{2}O at 700 °C (973 K)

== Gallery ==
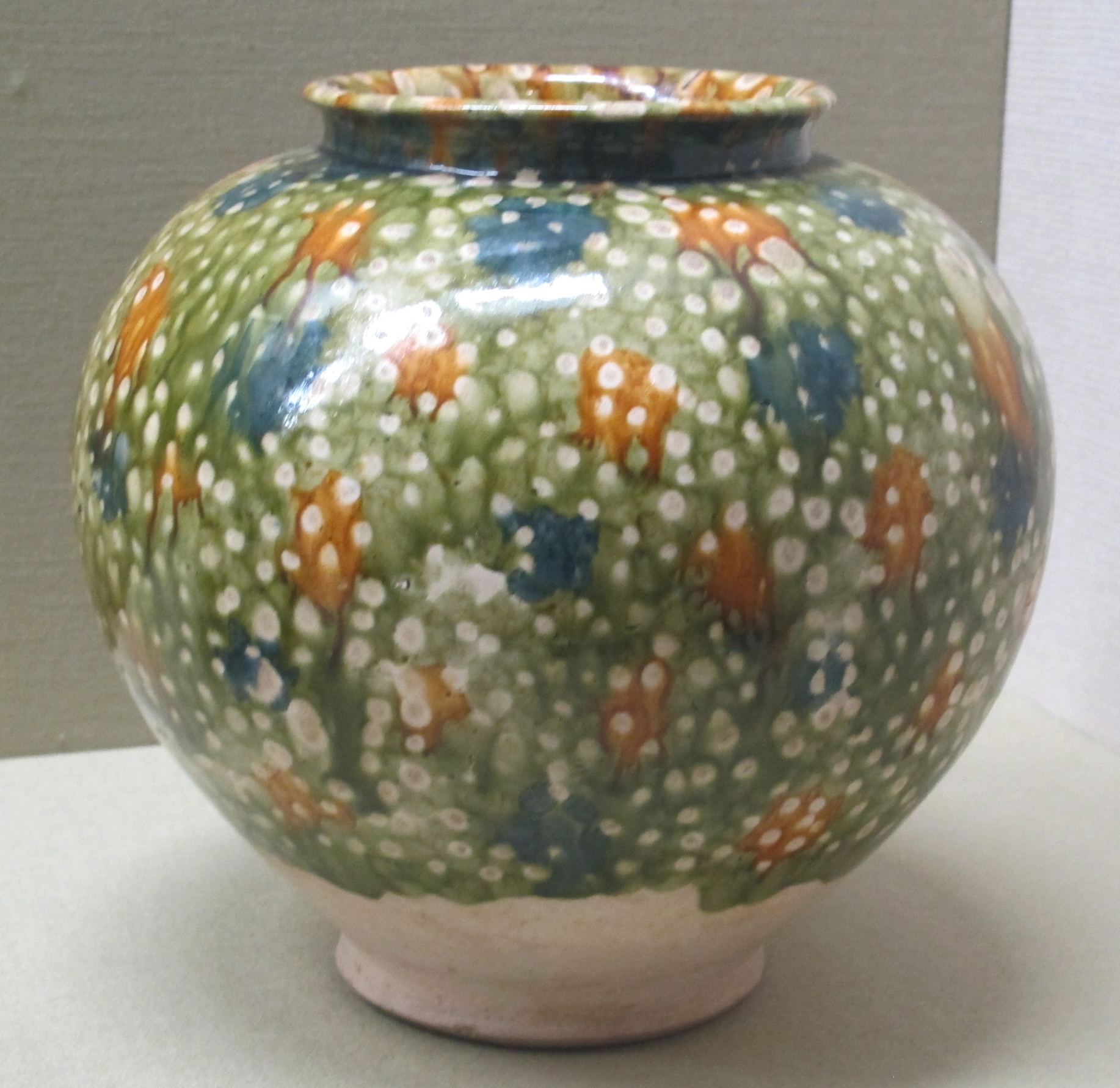
Pottery, Nara period

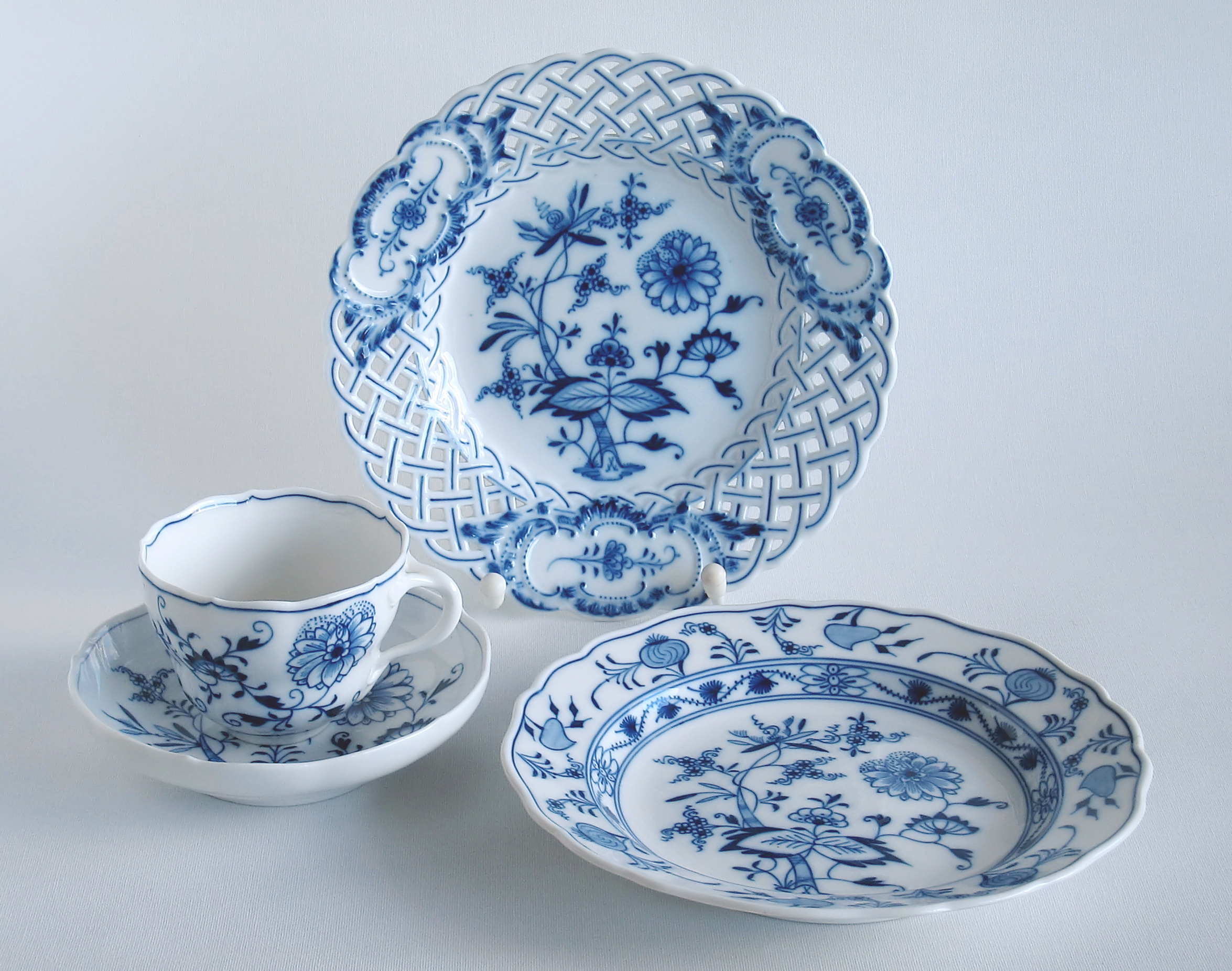
Meissen porcelain, with blue underglaze decoration on porcelain

Mug with blue underglaze decoration on porcelain.

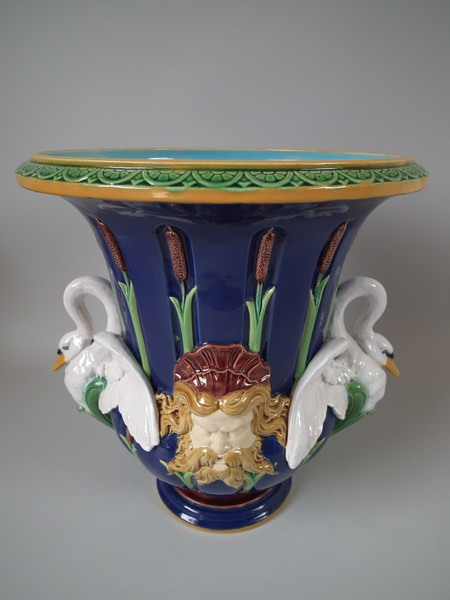
Coloured lead glazes majolica circa 1870

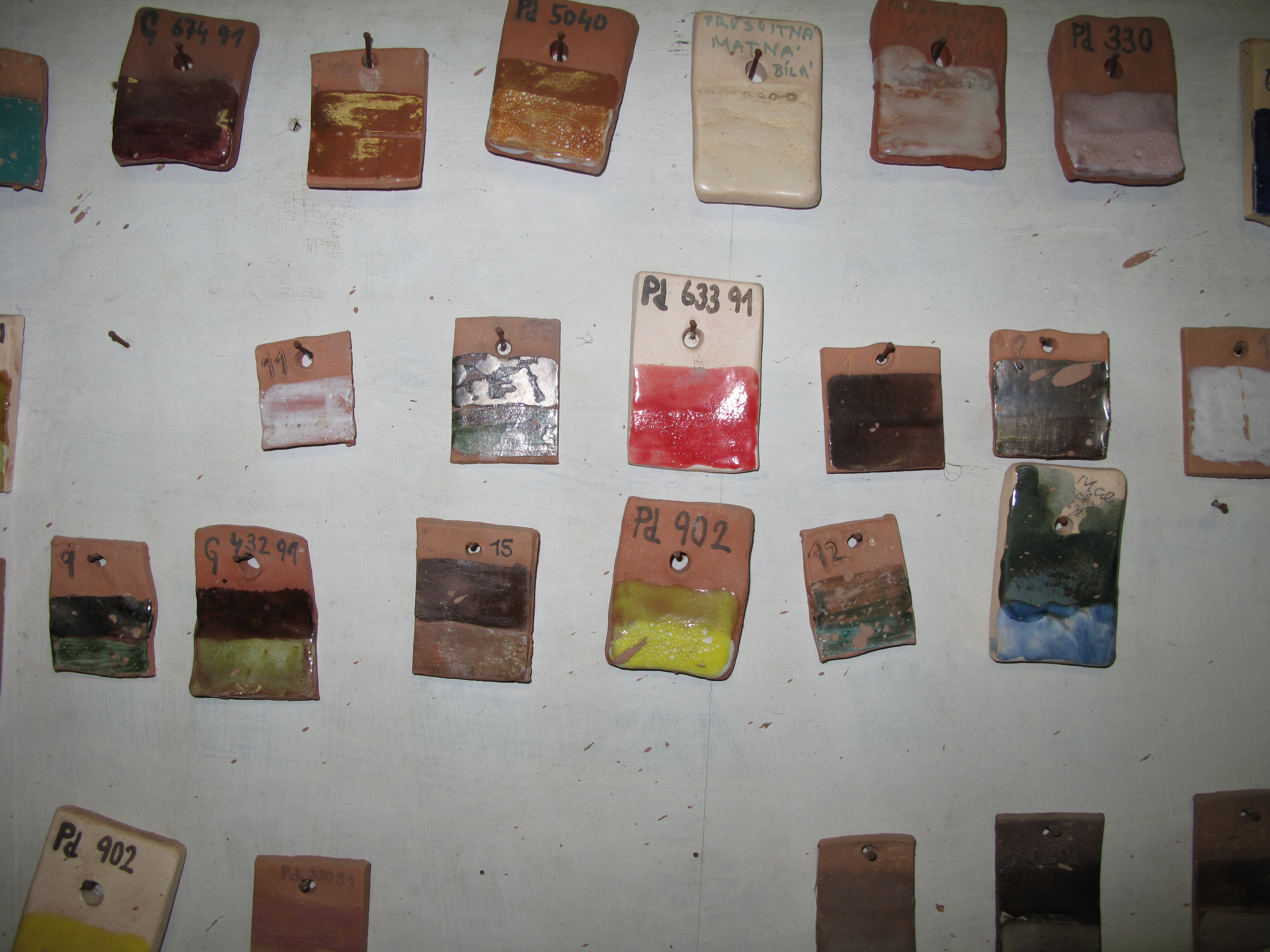
Test slabs of different glazes

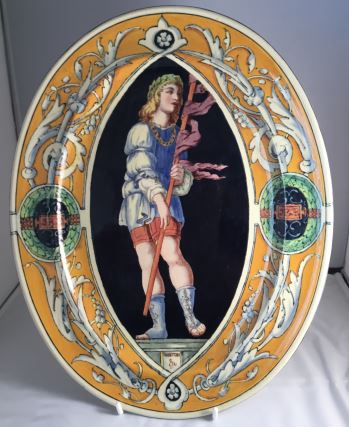
Tin-glazed majolica decorated with metallic oxide colours, Mintons, circa 1870.

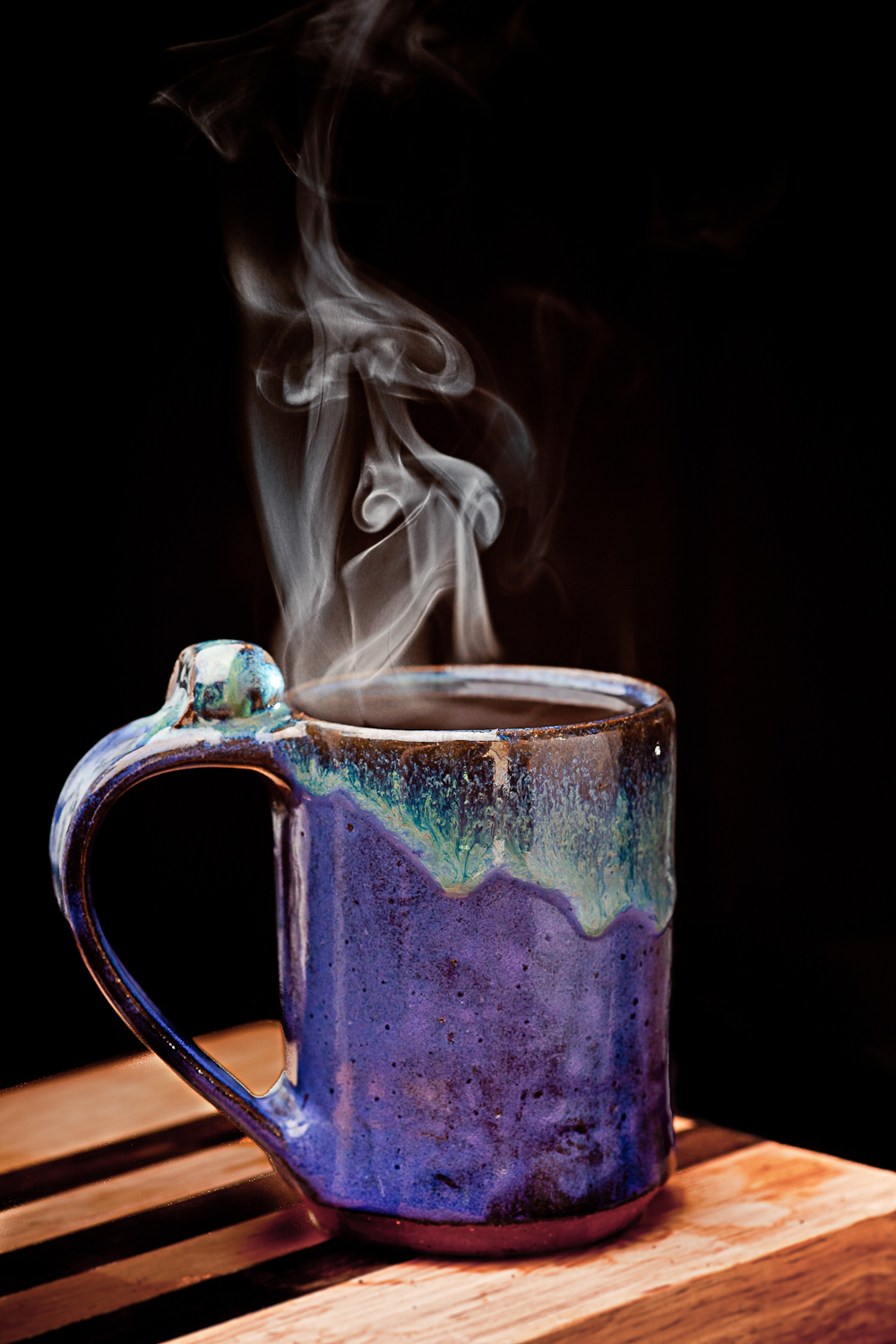
20th century glazing technique

== See also ==
- Celadon
- Frit
- Glaze defects
- Glazing techniques
- Shino ware
- Swatow ware
- Uranium tile
- Vitreous enamel
