= Awards and decorations =

Awards and decorations may refer to:

- Award, something given to a recipient in recognition of excellence in a certain field
- Civil awards and decorations, awarded to civilians for distinguished service or for eminence in a field of endeavour
- Military awards and decorations, distinctions given as a mark of honor for military heroism, meritorious or outstanding service or achievement

== See also ==
- Decoration (disambiguation)
