= Chocolate Jar with Iron-Locked Lid =

Piece of earthenware with tin-glaze

Chocolate Jar With Iron-Locked Lid
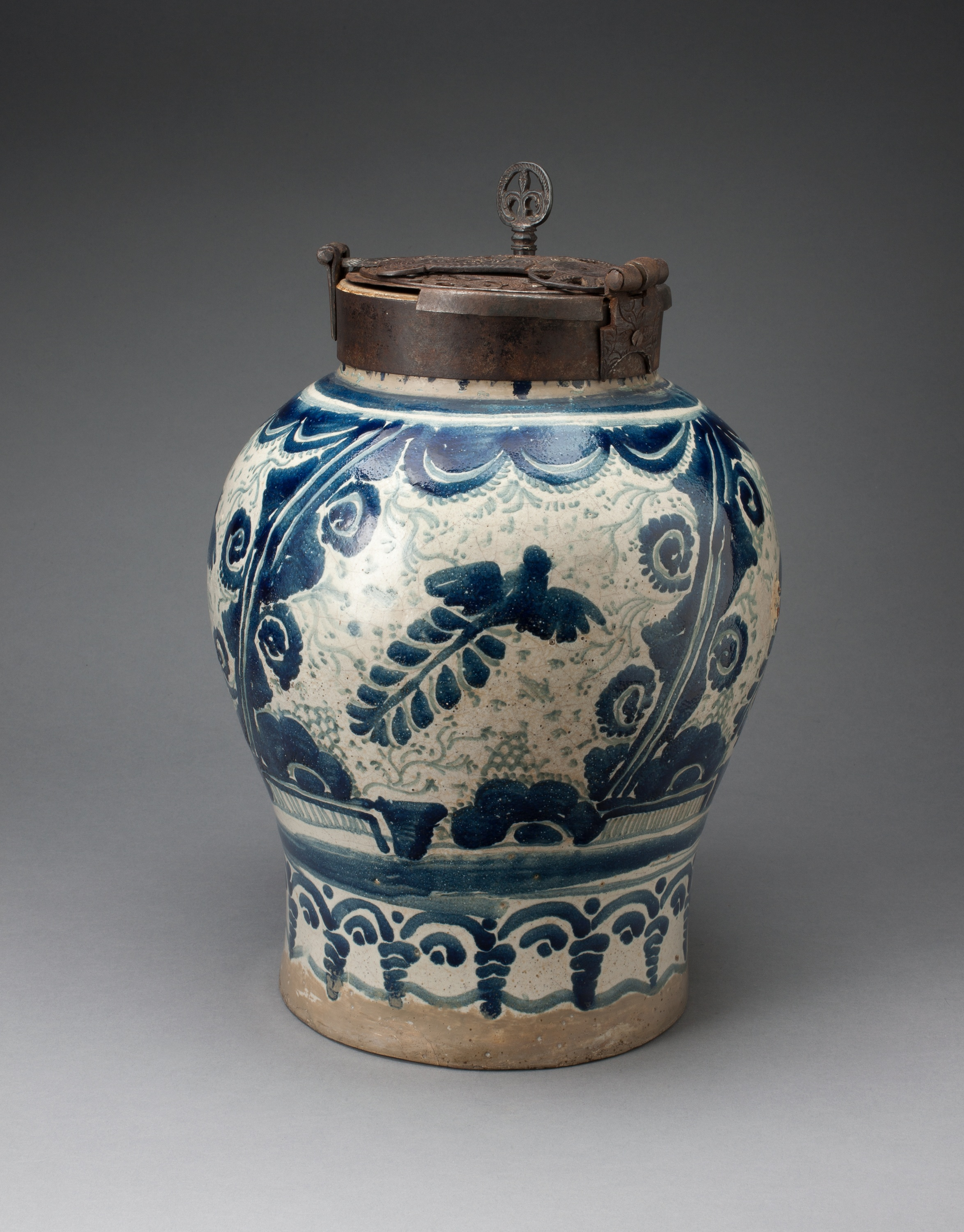
- Artist: Unknown
- Year: 1625–1671
- Medium: Tin-glazed Earthenware, Iron Works
- Movement: Talavera poblana
- Dimensions: 38.1 cm × 27.9 cm (15 in × 11 in)
- Location: Art Institute of Chicago, Chicago
- Website: www.artic.edu/artworks/10703/chocolate-jar-with-iron-locked-lid

Chocolate Jar with Iron-Locked Lid is a piece of earthenware with tin-glaze. It was created in Puebla, Mexico, sometime between 1725 and 1775. It was made in the style of Talavera poblana developed out of the tradition in Talavera, Spain, and was also influenced by Chinese ceramic traditions. This vessel was used to house cacao beans. The jar is part of the Herbert Pickering Lewis Collection of Mexican Pottery at the Art Institute of Chicago and has been included in a handful of exhibitions.

== Description ==
The vessel's opening is slightly narrower than its base. Its midsection bulges out just below the neck and tapers in a few inches from the bottom. The bottom edge does not have any glaze on it leaving the naked clay exposed. The body of the vessel is covered in a white glaze base and is decorated with hand-painted designs in varying opacities of a deep rich blue. The designs are placed in a repeating motif four times around the bulging middle of the vessel. Each contains a mix of swirls, flowers, branches, and scallop designs. In the center of each motif is a bird with a long tail. Over the neck of the vessel, a lid made of iron is placed. The lid's top is decorated with organic leaf filigree and has a key sticking out of it. The top is attached with an iron hinge to the collar of the neck.

== Historical background ==
=== Spanish origins ===
This artistic tradition and its name originated in Spain, specifically Talavera de la Reina in Toledo, which was known for its tin-glazed earthenware. Margaret Connors McQuade, in her chapter on the "Talavera Poblana: Four Centuries of a Mexican Ceramic Tradition" in Talavera Poblana: Four Centuries of a Mexican Ceramic Tradition, states that it is unclear exactly how the Talavera pottery style made its way over to Mexico. However, she points to a theory that some Dominican friars in Puebla requested that other friars come from Talavera to introduce the techniques. There is still evidence of the Spanish origins in some of the decorations. For example, the slanted parallel lines that make panels with the repeated motif, the fabric swags, and the fringe are all featured on this vessel come from the Talavera style of Spain.

=== Chinese influence ===
Talavera poblana was also influenced by tin-glazed Chinese porcelain. Chinese porcelain was introduced to Mexico as a part of the shipping route in the later 1500s. Shipments of porcelain would arrive in Acapulco from China and then make their way across the land to Puebla, Orizaba, and finally, Veracruz where they departed for Spain. Besides the use of Blue and white tin-glaze that has impacted several traditions of pottery making through transcontinental interaction, the influence that Chinese pottery left on Talavera poblana pottery is the motif of the phoenix found on pottery known as Swatow.

Another part of the Chinese influence of the Talavera Poblana is the use of a Money Jar or chocolatero as they began to be called in Mexico. Money jars were adapted to hold cacao beans and other valuable items. Like this jar, chocolatero often had iron lids that were locked with a key in order to protect its valuable contents from theft.

== Provenance ==
The chocolate jar was in the private collection of Herbert Pickering Lewis during the late 1800s and early 1900s. After his death in 1922, his wife donated it along with a large number of other pieces of Mexican pottery to the Art Institute of Chicago in 1924. This is where it has remained for the past century.

== Exhibition history ==
During its time at the Art Institute of Chicago, this Chocolate Jar was featured in three exhibitions. The first was in 1985. The vessel was loaned to the David and Alfred Smart Gallery at the University of Chicago for the exhibition: "Blue and White: Chinese Porcelain and Its Impact on the Western World." It ran from October 3 to December 1, 1985. The second exhibit "Silk Roads and Beyond: Travel, Trade, and Transformation," took place at the Art Institute of Chicago from September 30, 2006, to April 22, 2007. The third exhibition was titled "For Kith and Kin: The Folk Art Collection At the Art Institute of Chicago." This exhibit took place in 2012.
