= Decorate =

Decorate most commonly refers to the application of any of form of decoration.

Decorate may also refer to:

- Decorate (album), a 2010 studio album by Yuna
- Decorate (EP), a 2011 EP by Malaysian singer Yuna
- "Decorate", a 2024 single by Japanese VTuber Hakui Koyori

== See also ==
- Decorated (disambiguation)
