= Decorated =

Decorated may refer to:

- "Decorated Period" or "Decorated Gothic", a period and style of mediaeval Gothic architecture.
- A person who has been awarded a military award or decoration
- "Decorated", a song by Crazy Town from the album Darkhorse

== See also ==
- Decoration (disambiguation)
