= Underglaze =

Pottery decorating technique

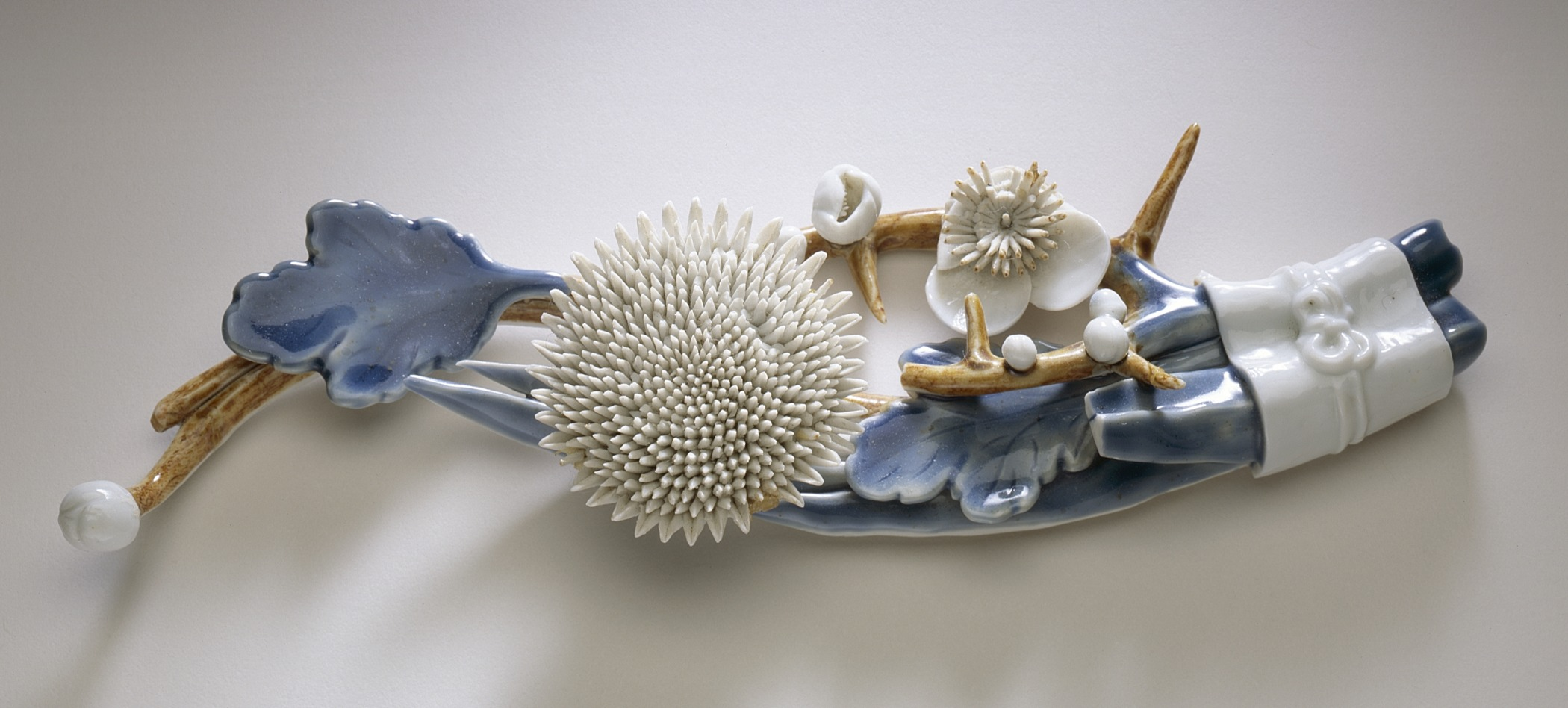
Japanese porcelain Hirado ware paperweight with chrysanthemums and plum blossoms, underglaze blue and brown, 19th-century

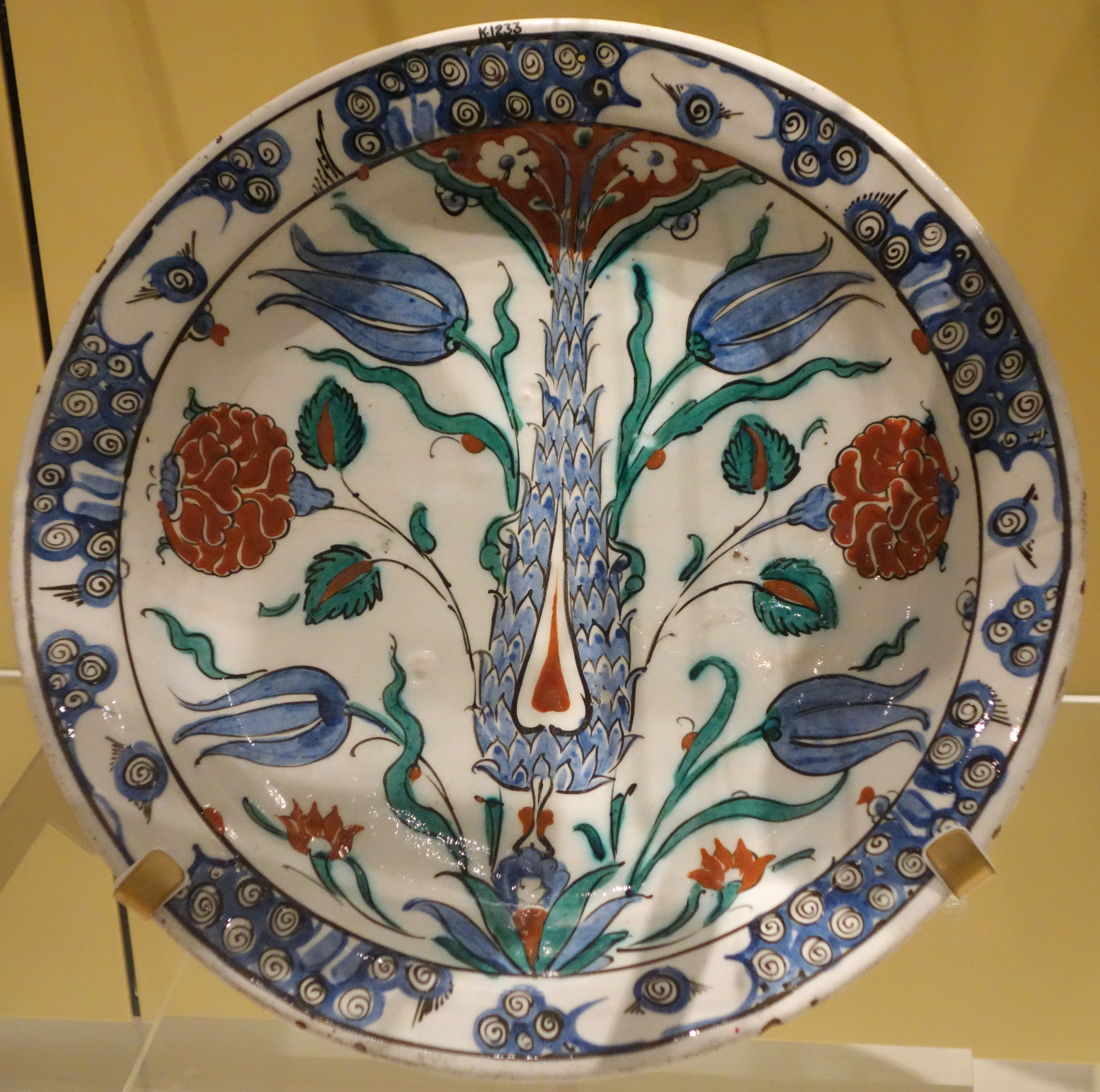
Dish with cypress, Turkey, İznik, c. 1575, underglaze-painted stonepaste – Royal Ontario Museum – DSC04735

Underglaze is a method of decorating pottery in which painted decoration is applied to the surface before it is covered with a transparent ceramic glaze and fired in a kiln. Because the glaze subsequently covers it, such decoration is completely durable, and it also allows the production of pottery with a surface that has a uniform sheen. Underglaze decoration uses pigments derived from oxides which fuse with the glaze when the piece is fired in a kiln. It is also a cheaper method, as only a single firing is needed, whereas overglaze decoration requires a second firing at a lower temperature.

Many historical styles, for example Persian mina'i ware, Japanese Imari ware, Chinese doucai and wucai, combine the two types of decoration. In such cases the first firing for the body, underglaze decoration and glaze is followed by the second firing after the overglaze enamels have been applied. However, because the main or glost firing is at a higher temperature than used in overglaze decoration, the range of colours available in underglaze is more limited, and was especially so for porcelain in historical times, as the firing temperature required for the porcelain body is especially high. Early porcelain was largely restricted to underglaze blue, and a range of browns and reds. Other colours turned black in a high-temperature firing.

Examples of oxides that do not lose their colour during a glost firing are the cobalt blue made famous by Chinese Ming dynasty blue and white porcelain and the cobalt and turquoise blues, pale purple, sage green, and bole red characteristic of İznik pottery – only some European centres knew how to achieve a good red. The painting styles used are covered at (among other articles): china painting, blue and white pottery, tin-glazed pottery, maiolica, Egyptian faience, Delftware. In modern times a wider range of underglaze colours are available.

An archaeological excavation at the Tongguan kiln Site proved that the technology of underglaze colour arose in the Tang and Five Dynasties periods and originated from Tonguan, Changsha. However cobalt blue was first used in Persian pottery. The technique has been very widely used for earthenware and porcelain, but much less often on stoneware.

== History ==
=== Ptolemaic faience ===
Ancient Egyptian faience production in the New Kingdom period employed the use of underglaze in works producing green and blue pieces that are distinct from other eras of production. This was achieved by the use of an underglaze that contrasts with the overglaze. This produces the effect of highlighting and lending spectral variance to relief patterns that are embossed into pieces such as tableware such as bowls or jars. Desired blue and green finishes were achieved with the use of copper oxide on their glazing process. Ptolemaic faience has a self-glazing process. In addition to not using successive layers of glaze after the underglaze, Ptolemaic faience also applied a lower kiln temperature. At the firing stage a bake between 900 and 1,000 °C (1,650 and 1,830 °F) is applied to achieve a spectrum between turquoise blue and green. Underglaze in Ptolemaic faience was widely used for Ushabti dolls en masse for grave goods in the late Kingdom period.

=== Chinese porcelain ===
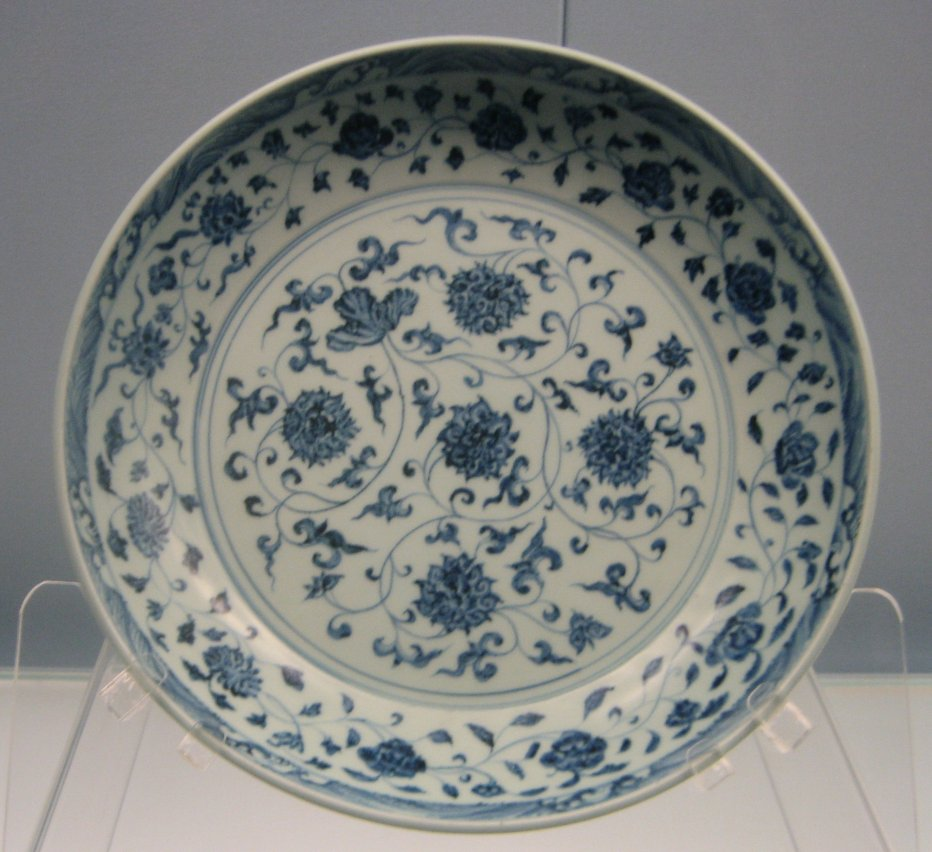
Chinese porcelain dish with the typical Ming underglaze blue on white porcelain, Xuande Reign 1426–1435, Ming

Through the Yuan and Ming dynasty, Imperial porcelain was produced with red oxide underglazes and more popular cobalt blue. Cobalt blue underglaze porcelain was adopted into the imperial style for both domestic production and Chinese export porcelain under the Yuan, Ming and Qing dynasties. Until late in the Xuande period the cobalt was imported from Persia; it has specks with high iron and low manganese content. This cobalt had a tendency to run when used in a tin glaze, and Persian artisans relied on the experimentation of the Chinese in Jingdezhen porcelain to achieve clear blue designs in their ceramics. Chinese whiteware was prized as an import to Islamic countries that would then trade cobalt for the manufacture of more Chinese porcelain. This was changed to a Chinese form of cobalt that in its ore form had a higher composition of MnFe_{2}O_{4} (Jacobsite) rather than Fe_{3}O_{4} (Iron(II,III) oxide). Due to the Middle Eastern demand for blue and white porcelain the primary use of this underglaze technology was utilised in creating many designs with Islamic decoration.

=== Faience ===
Most styles in this group, such as Delftware, mostly used blue and white pottery decoration.

=== Islamic world ===
Classical İznik pottery from the Ottoman Empire has a stonepaste or frit body, and uses lead glazing rather than tin, and has usually been painted in polychrome. Persian pottery, which was aware of Chinese styles throughout the period, made great use of underglaze decoration, but mostly in a single colour, often blue using the local cobalt, but also black.

=== English transfer printed earthenware ===
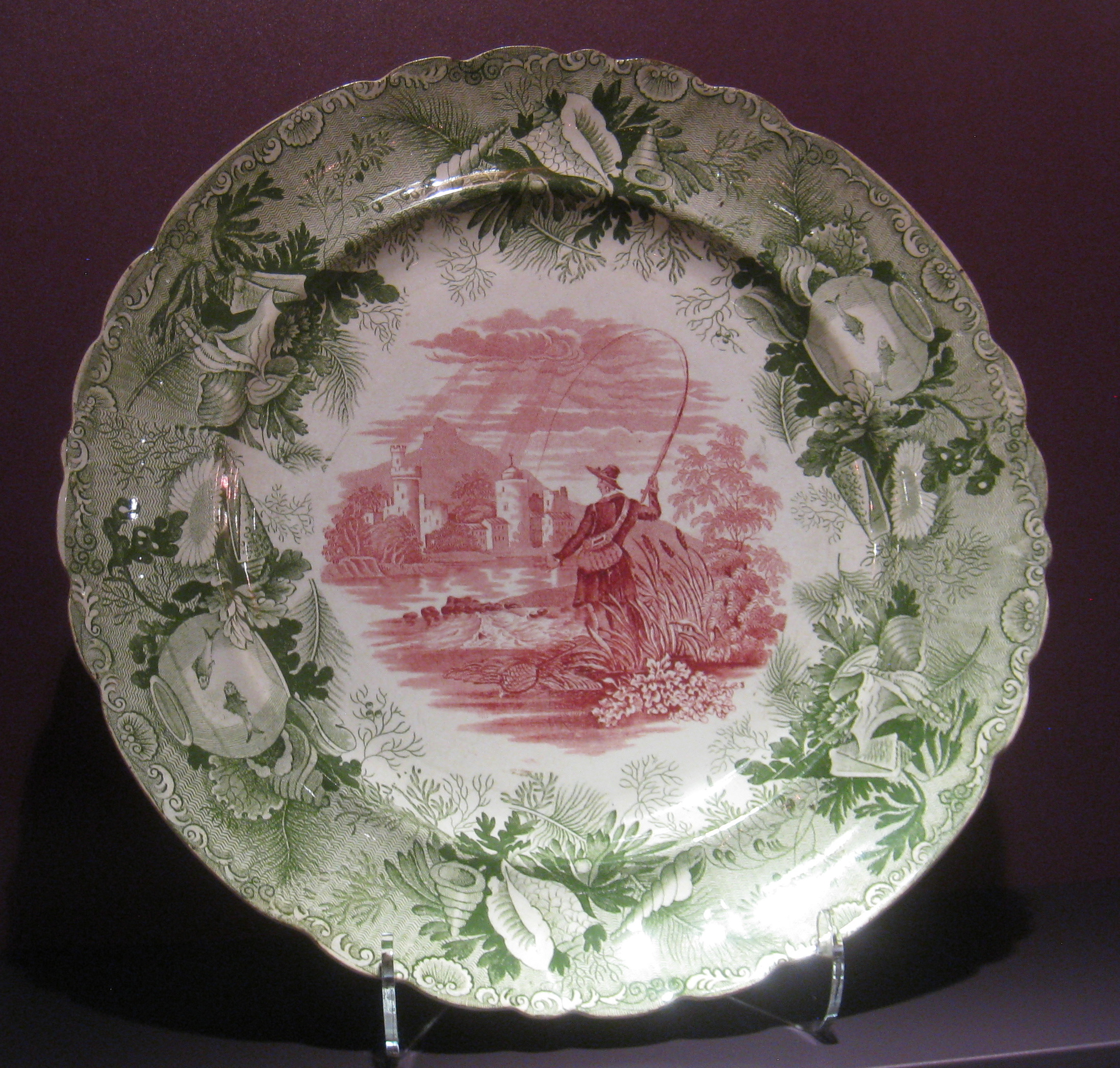
Transfer printed plate using two transfers, puce and green, c. 1830, Staffordshire pottery, Enoch Wood & Co.

Underglaze normally uses a transparent glaze, and therefore reveals the undecorated parts of the fired body. In porcelain these are white, but many of the imitative types, such as Delftware, have brownish earthenware bodies, which are given a white tin-glaze and either inglaze or overglaze decoration. With the English invention of creamware and other white-bodied earthenwares in the 18th century, underglaze decoration became widely used on earthenware as well as porcelain.

Transfer printing of underglaze was developed in England in Staffordshire pottery from the 1760s. The patterns were produced in the same way as printed engravings which were in industrial production at the time. A copper printing plate engraved with the design would transfer underglaze pigment to a piece of dampened tissue paper through a rolled press which could then be adhered to earthenware. The colourants were metallic pigments such as cobalt blue but also include the use of chromium to create greens and browns. To ensure clean transfer, quick firing at a low temperature might be given to fix the colours, known as "hardening on".

Initially most production just included one colour, but later techniques were developed for printing in several colours. One type of English Creamware using blue, green, orange and yellow colours is known as "Prattware", after the leading manufacturer. This technique was also used in Europe and America in the 19th century on Creamware.

=== Current use ===
Underglaze is available in a variety of colours from commercial retailers and is used in industrial production of pottery. Low firing temperature underglazes have been formulated as well as application options such as in the form of liquid pens of glaze or solid chalk blocks. The application of underglaze techniques such as stained slips have diversified and a variety of artists have created independent chemical processes of their own to achieve desired effects. Within commercial production there is a decline in underglaze use in comparison to 18th century use due to the creation and improvement of other glazing techniques that do not require such a high heat point. The vibrancy that only underglaze was able to supply is now achievable with a variety of over-glazes therefore discounting the advantage that underglaze commercial production had.

A well-known New York underglaze tile and pottery decorator of the 1940s, Carol Janeway (1913-1989), was diagnosed with lead poisoning after eight years of using a lead-based overglaze, retiring in 1950. Her tiles' glazes tested strongly for lead in 2010 using X-Ray Fluorescence technology.

=== Underglaze transfers ===
Underglaze transfers are a technique that involves screenprinting or free handing a pattern onto a transfer paper (often washi paper or newspaper) which is then placed, dampened, and burnished onto the surface of a leather-hard piece of clay (similar to how a lick-and-stick tattoo might be applied). Artists can acquire rice paper to make their own custom designs, and also purchase pre-printed designs online. Unlike overglaze decals, underglaze decals are often applied to greenware and bisque and fired at higher temperatures compared to their overglaze counterparts.

== Forgeries ==
The desirability of specific periods of white and blue underglaze Chinese porcelain has led to wide and sophisticated forgery operations. The collector market of blue and white underglaze porcelain is notable due to Orientalism's popularity in Europe. Counterfeiting operations have developed both in foreign areas and within China to profit from the collectability of Ming and Qing dynasty blue and white porcelain. From the baroque period onward, there was a slight decline in the profitability of forging Chinese porcelain as European hard paste techniques were developed but kept as industry secrets in countries such as Germany and France. Despite this there still was and continues to be a high European demand for Chinese blue and White porcelain. In the last three decades there has been a considerable increase in demand for antiques of Ming and Qing porcelain amongst China's rising middle class, which has led to another growth in counterfeiting efforts to supply the large amount of new collectors. This counterfeiting is performed within China and sold to its own population unlike previous rushes in Europe.

== Analysis of composition ==
Due to the extensive efforts to counterfeit Chinese blue and white porcelain, there has been a promotion of detailed scientific analysis of the composition of cobalt used in the underglazes through xeroradiography which has provided insight to the chemical make up of original underglaze recipes on a chemical scale. This in turn reveals historical data about the supply and manufacture industry within China at the time of production of each piece.

=== Identification of pigment in scientific research ===
Multiple enquires are being made in an academic and scientific context as to quantifying the physical and chemical composition of multiple types of underglaze. X-ray fluorescence is a primary building block if this but is not acceptable for full understanding. The more prevalent techniques include the use of synchrotron radiation-based techniques. This is to achieve an analysis of the microstructure of underglazes and attempt in verifying and dating historical porcelains such as those of the Ming dynasty. This functions as a method to identify pigments and their origin. Such information is conducive to understanding the trade relations of nations at given times as pigments are sourced internationally and speak to the relationships between nations or empires. Differing cobalts used to colour underglazes in the Middle East and Asia regions were traded and that evidence can be found by inspecting the microstructures of historic samples of pottery using these underglazes therefore supporting other archaeological data on the interactions of these cultures.
