= Muffle furnace =

Type of furnace

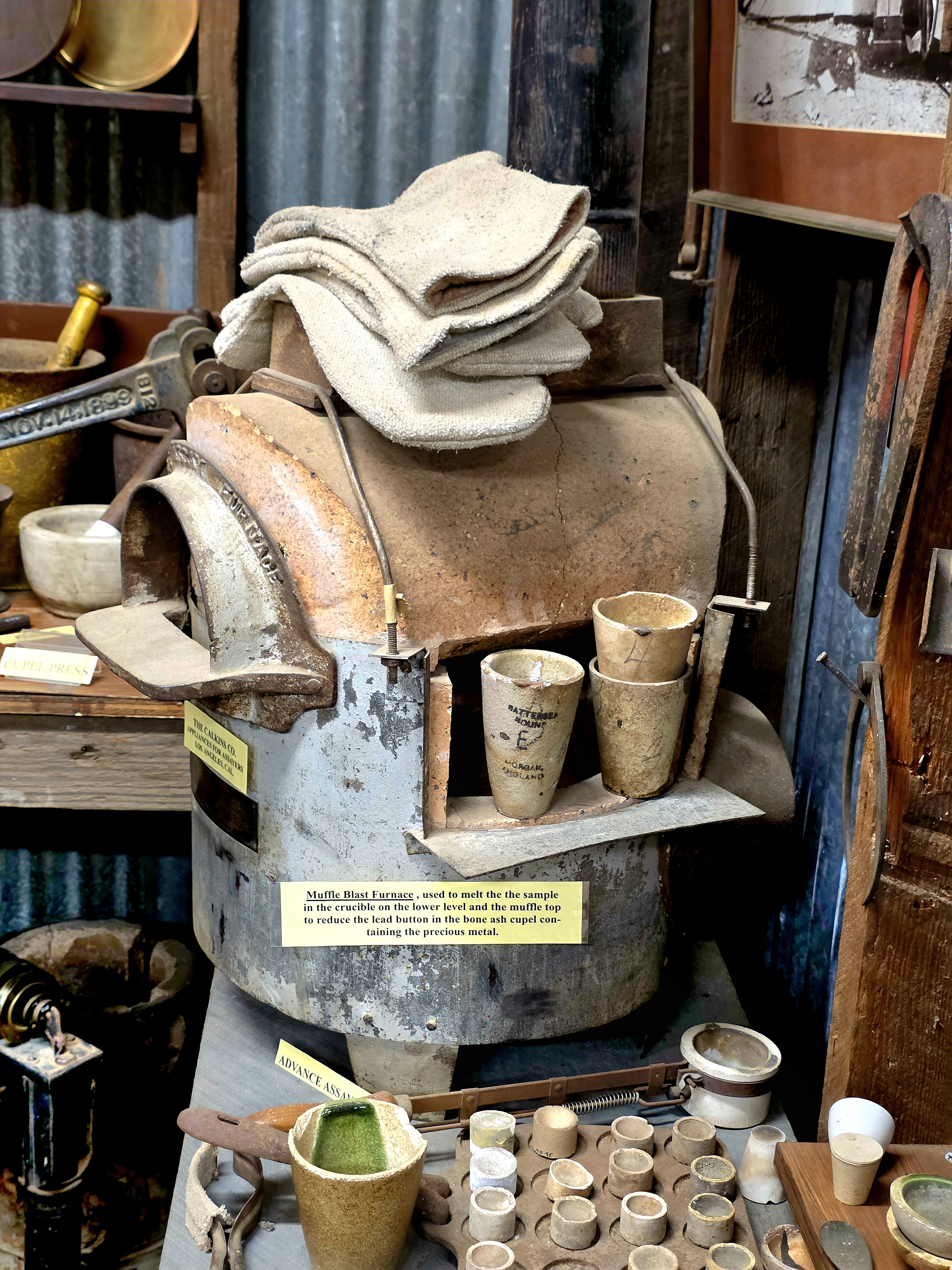
An historic muffle blast furnace used in gold assaying, made by the Calkins Company in Los Angeles

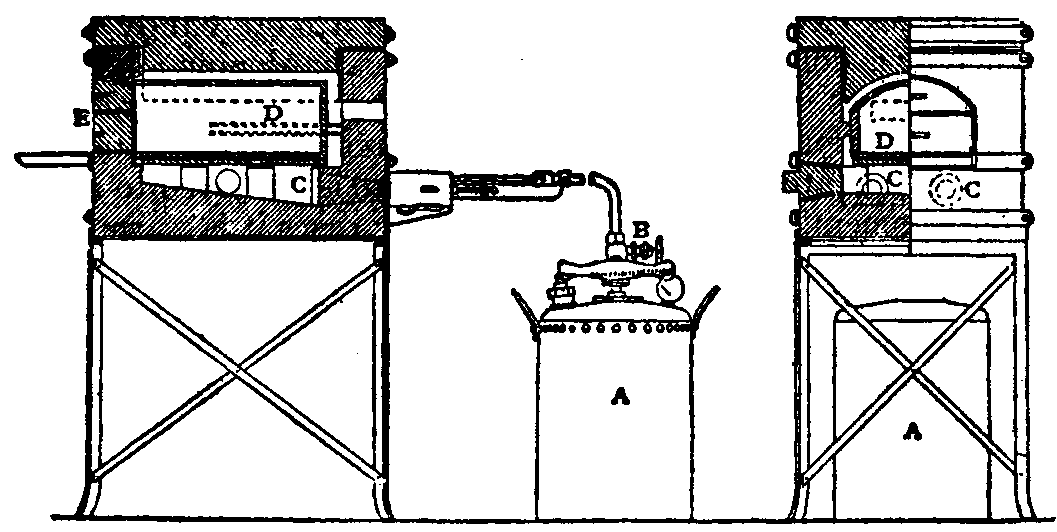
An Automatic Oil Muffle Furnace, circa 1910. Petroleum is contained in tank A and is kept under pressure by pumping at intervals with the wooden handle, so that when the valve B is opened, the oil is vaporized by passing through a heating coil at the furnace entrance, and when ignited burns fiercely as a gas flame. The flame passes into the furnace through the two holes, C, and plays under and up around the muffle D, standing on a fireclay slab. The doorway is closed by two fireclay blocks at E.

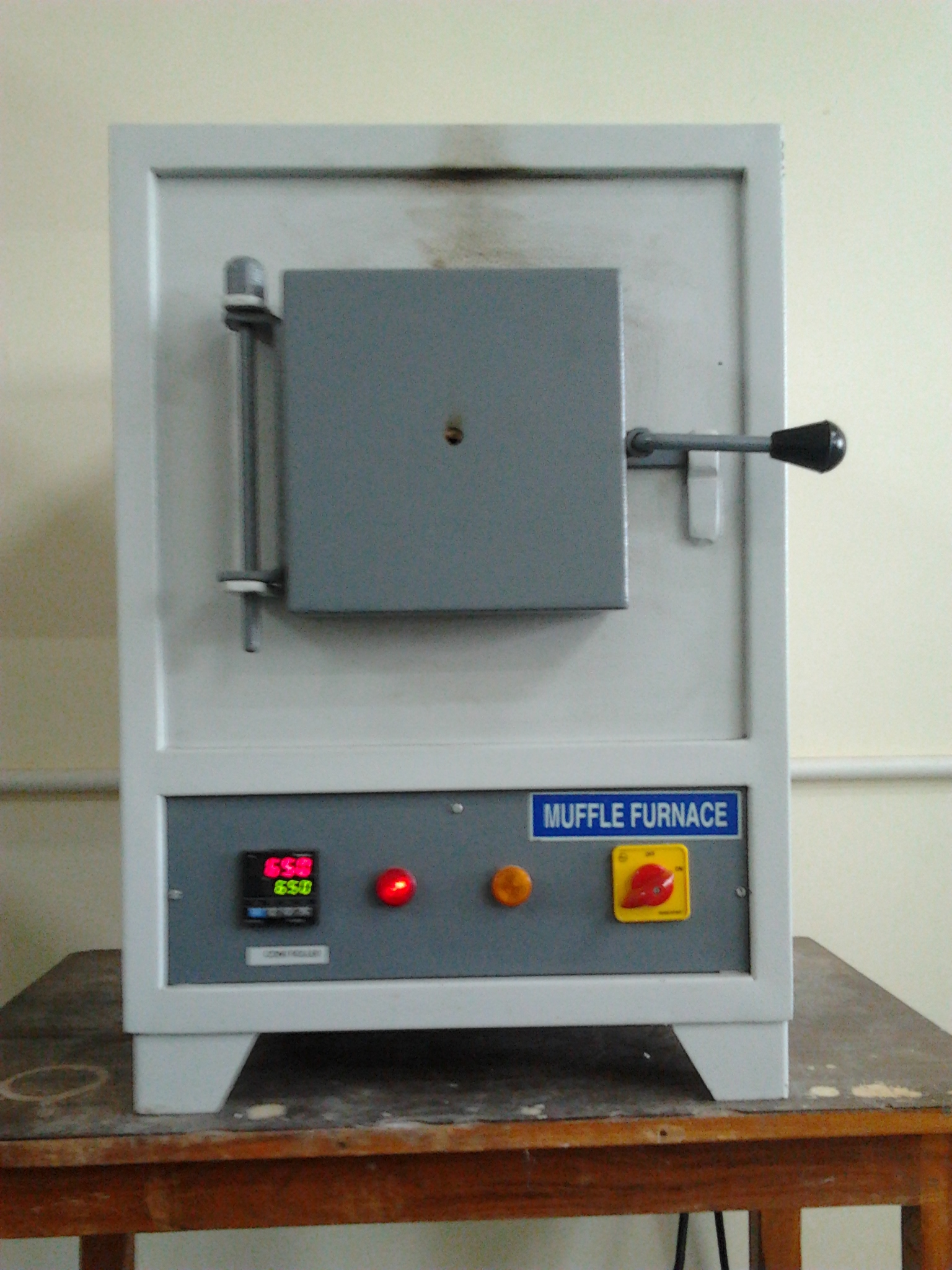
High temperature muffle-furnace, maximum temperature is 1,473 K (1,200 °C; 2,192 °F).

A muffle furnace or muffle oven (sometimes retort furnace in historical usage) is a furnace in which the subject material is isolated from the fuel and all of the products of combustion, including gases and flying ash. After the development of high-temperature heating elements and widespread electrification in developed countries, new muffle furnaces quickly moved to electric designs.

== Modern furnace ==
Today, a muffle furnace is often a front-loading box-type oven or kiln for high-temperature applications such as fusing glass, creating enamel coatings, ceramics and soldering and brazing articles. They are also used in many research facilities, for example by chemists in order to determine what proportion of a sample is non-combustible and non-volatile (i.e., ash). Some models incorporate programmable digital controllers, allowing automatic execution of ramping, soaking, and sintering steps. Also, advances in materials for heating elements, such as molybdenum disilicide, can now produce working temperatures up to 1,800 degrees Celsius (3,272 degrees Fahrenheit), which facilitate more sophisticated metallurgical applications. The heat source may be gas or oil burners, but more often they are now electric.

The term muffle furnace may also be used to describe another oven constructed on many of the same principles as the box-type kiln mentioned above, but takes the form of a long, wide, and thin hollow tube used in roll-to-roll manufacturing processes.

Both of the above-mentioned furnaces are usually heated to desired temperatures by conduction, convection, or blackbody radiation from electrical resistance heater elements. Therefore, there is (usually) no combustion involved in the temperature control of the system, which allows for much greater control of temperature uniformity and ensures isolation of the material being heated from the byproducts of fuel combustion.

== Muffle kilns ==
Historically, small muffle ovens were often used for a second firing of porcelain at a relatively low temperature to fix overglaze enamels; these tend to be called muffle kilns. The pigments for most enamel colours discoloured at the high temperatures required for the body and glaze of the porcelain. They were used for painted enamels on metal for the same reason.

Like other types of muffle furnaces, the design isolates the objects from the flames producing the heat (with electricity this is not so important). For historical overglaze enamels the kiln was generally far smaller than that for the main firing and produced firing temperatures in the approximate range of 750 to 950 °C, depending on the colours used. Typically, wares were fired for between five and twelve hours and then cooled over twelve hours.
