= Decorator =

Decorator can refer to:

- A house painter and decorator
- Interior design
- Decorator pattern in object-oriented programming
- Function decorators, in Python
- The Decorator, a 1920 film starring Oliver Hardy
