= Overglaze decoration =

Method of decorating pottery

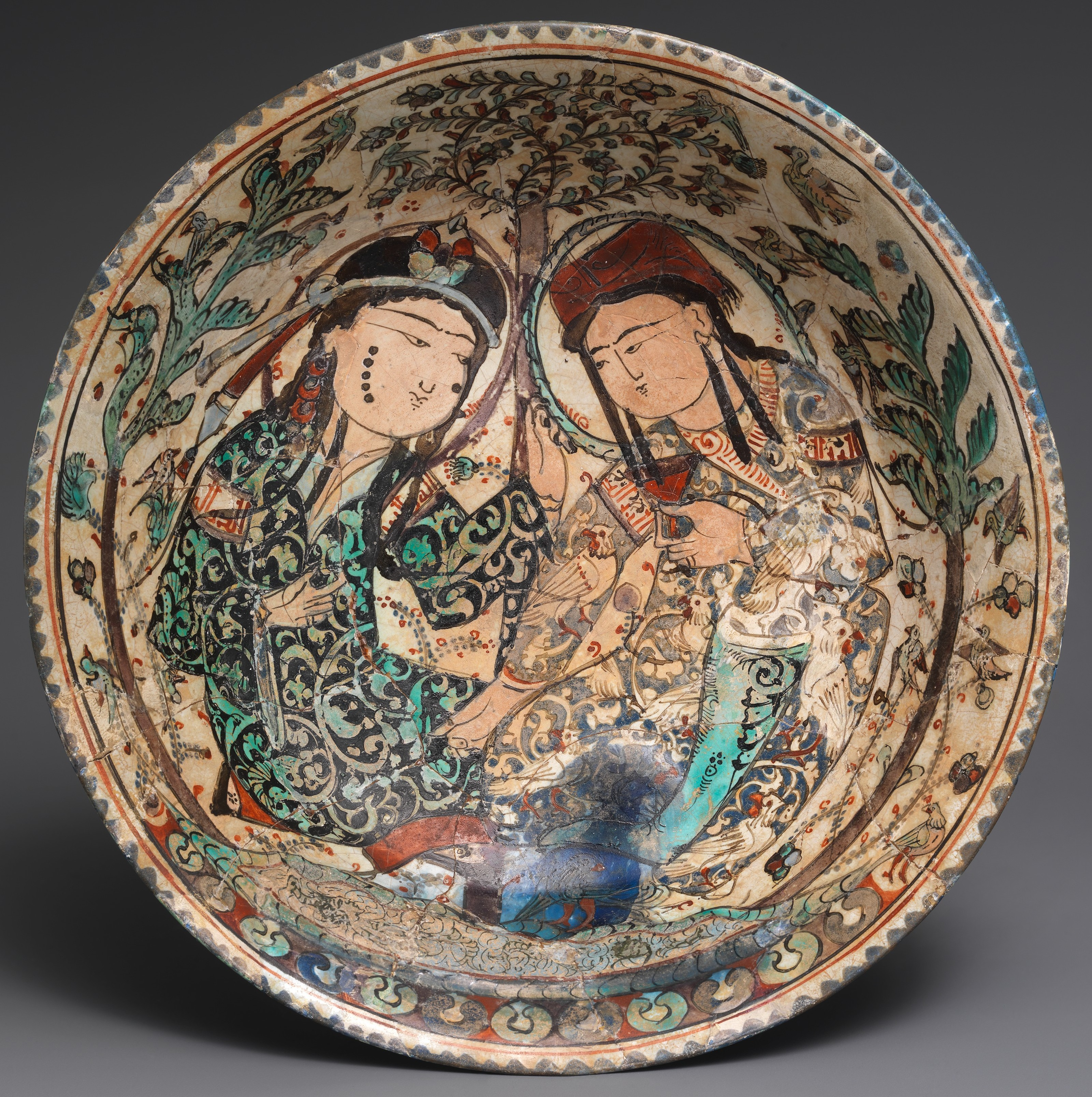
Mina'i ware bowl with couple in a garden, around 1200. These Persian wares are very slightly earlier than the first Chinese use of overglaze enamels. Diameter 18.8 cm.

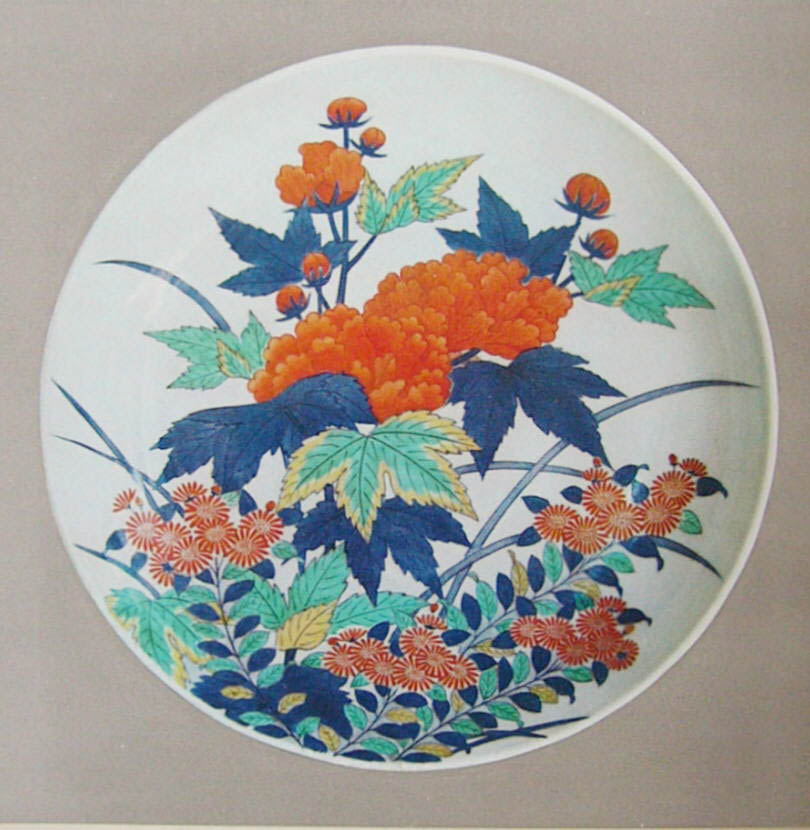
Nabeshima ware plate with floral design, Arita, Japan, late 17th century, Edo period.

Overglaze decoration, overglaze enamelling, or on-glaze decoration, is a method of decorating pottery, most often porcelain, where the coloured decoration is applied on top of the already fired and glazed surface, and then fixed in a second firing at a relatively low temperature, often in a muffle kiln. It is often described as producing "enamelled" decoration. The colours fuse onto the glaze, so the decoration becomes durable. This decorative firing is usually done at a lower temperature which allows for a more varied and vivid palette of colours, using pigments which will not colour correctly at the high temperature necessary to fire the porcelain body. Historically, a relatively narrow range of colours could be achieved with underglaze decoration, where the coloured pattern is applied before glazing, notably the cobalt blue of blue and white porcelain.

Many historical styles, for example mina'i ware, Imari ware, Chinese doucai, and wucai, combine the two types of decoration. In such cases the first firing for the body, underglaze decoration and glaze is followed by the second firing after the overglaze enamels have been applied.

The technique essentially uses powdered glass mixed with coloured pigments, and is the application of vitreous enamel to pottery; enamelled glass is very similar but on glass. Both these latter two are essentially painting techniques, and have been since they began. In contrast, on metal painting in enamel arrived very late, long after techniques such as cloisonné, where thin wires are applied to form raised barriers, which contain areas of (subsequently applied) enamel, and champlevé, where the metal surface is sunk to form areas where the enamel is poured.

In Chinese porcelain, enamels were and are sometimes applied to unglazed pieces; this is called "enamel on the biscuit" and similar terms.

== History ==
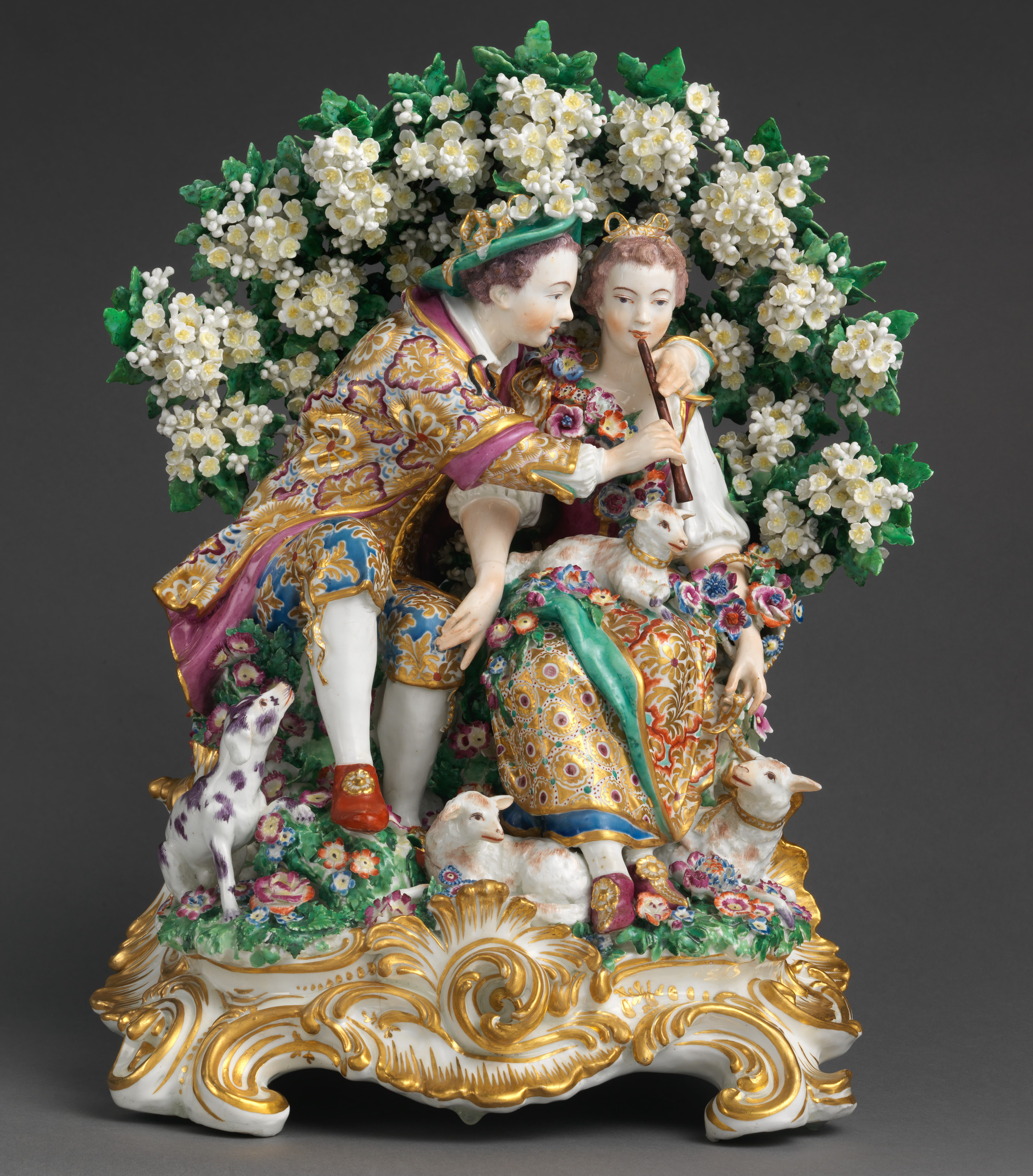
Chelsea porcelain factory, The Music Lesson, gold anchor, c. 1765, with bocage background. 15 3/8 × 12 1/4 × 8 3/4 inches, 22 lb. (39.1 × 31.1 × 22.2 cm, 10 kg). different version, different angle.

Enamel was used in jewellery, applied to metal, from very early on: there are examples in the Tomb of Tutankhamun of c. 1325 BC. Enamel was also used to decorate glass by the time of the Roman Empire. Applied to pottery, it is first seen in Persian mina'i ware from the late 12th century, using a group of seven main colours. Presumably the potters learnt the technique from glassmakers.

Slightly later it appeared in Chinese ceramics in Cizhou stoneware from as early as the 13th century, with use on porcelain following within a century, though it did not become predominant until later, and the full possibilities were not realized until the 17th and 18th centuries in the famille jaune, noire, rose, verte group of palettes. Some techniques use thin metal leaf, including mina'i ware as well as the more usual pigments, which are typically applied in a liquid or paste form, painted by brush, or using stencils or transfer printing. The Japanese kakiemon style, and other Japanese styles, used the technique from at least the second half of the 17th century. The technique was also developing in Europe, firstly in what the French called petit feu faience, and in the 18th century in porcelain, and there appears to have been some influence in both directions between Asia and Europe. From about 1770 to the mid 20th century it was the dominant decorative technique in expensive pottery, mostly porcelain, made in Europe, East Asia, and (to a lesser extent) North America.

In 18th-century England, where the technique was developed, the earliest forms of transfer printing on pottery, for example by Sadler & Green in Liverpool, were overglaze, although by the end of the century it was normal to print as underglaze.

Today overglaze decoration is much less commonly used, other than in traditionalist wares, as the range of colours available in underglaze has greatly expanded. Overglazes called "lusters" are still used for achieving special effects, such as iridescence of mother-of-pearl overglazes or metallic look of overglazes made with metal (eg. gold) particles.

== Muffle kilns ==
The kiln used for the second firing is usually called a muffle kiln in Europe; like other types of muffle furnaces the design isolates the objects from the flames producing the heat (with electricity this is not so important). For historical overglaze enamels the kiln was generally far smaller than that for the main firing, and produced firing temperatures in the approximate range of 750 to 950 °C, depending on the colours used. Typically, wares were fired for between five and twelve hours and then cooled over twelve hours.
