= Tin oxide =

Tin oxide may refer to:

- Tin(II) oxide (stannous oxide), a black powder with the formula SnO
- Tin(IV) oxide (tin dioxide, stannic oxide), a white powder with the formula SnO_{2}
