= Biscuit (pottery) =

Pottery fired without glaze

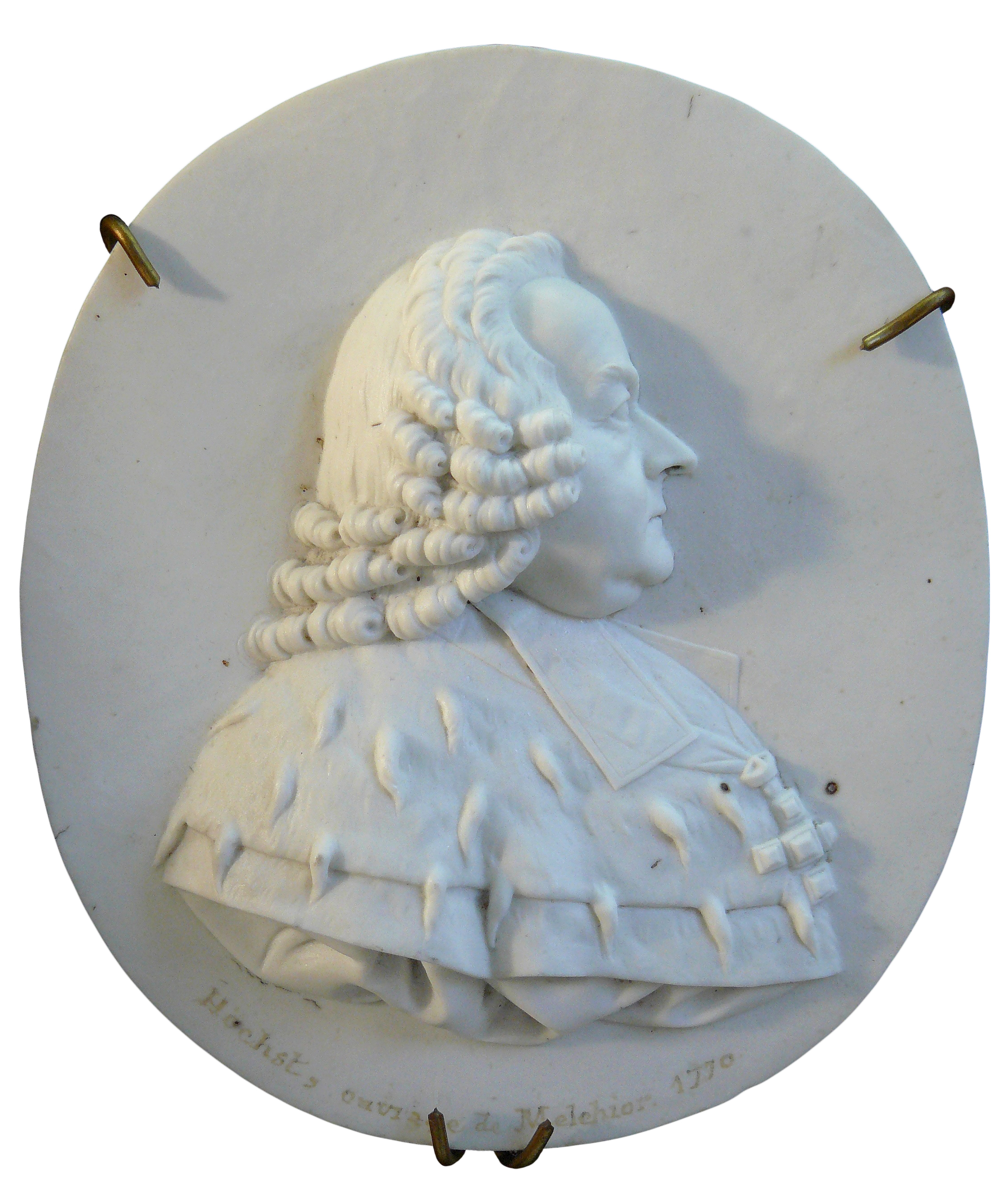
A bisque porcelain bust

Biscuit (also known as bisque) refers to any pottery that has been fired in a kiln without a ceramic glaze. This can be a final product such as biscuit porcelain or unglazed earthenware (such as terracotta) or, most commonly, an intermediate stage in a glazed final product.

Confusingly, "biscuit" may also be used as a term for pottery at a stage in its manufacture where it has not yet been fired or glazed, but has been dried so that it is no longer plastic (easily deformed).

The porous nature of (fired) biscuit earthenware means that it readily absorbs water, while vitreous wares such as porcelain, bone china and most stoneware are non-porous even without glazing. The temperature of biscuit firing is today usually at least 1000°C, although higher temperatures are common. The firing of the ware that results in the biscuit article causes permanent chemical and physical changes to occur. These result in a much harder and more resilient article which can still be porous, and this can ease the application of glazes.

In situations where two firings are used, the first firing is called the biscuit firing, and the second firing is called the glost firing, or glaze firing if the glaze is fired at that stage.
