= Flower-holder =

17th-century tulip vase

Coordinates: 52.0117°N 4.3544°E

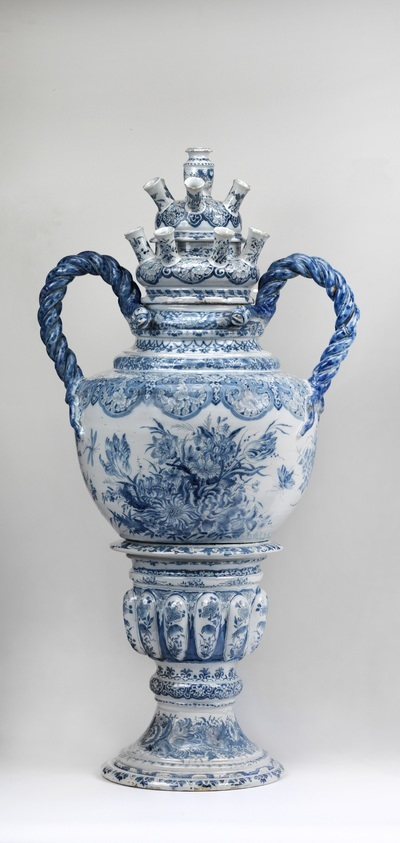
- Artist: De Griekse A
- Year: 1690s
- Type: Pair of Delftware Vases
- Dimensions: 102 cm × 52 cm (40 in × 20 in)
- Location: Museum Het Prinsenhof, Delft

Flower-holder
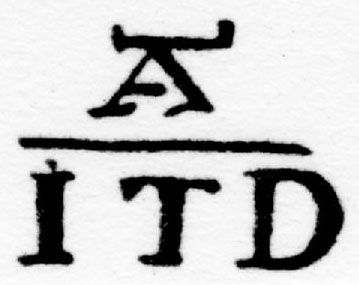
- Maker's mark of "The Greek A" factory

The Flower-holder (Tulpenvaas) is one of a matching pair of tulip vases dated to c. 1690 and currently in the collection of Museum Het Prinsenhof.

The pair was created in the tin-glazed delftware company called "De Griekse A" ("The Greek A") in Delft. A flower-holder such as these was meant to maximize the use of tulips and each tubular hole in the top was meant for one individual flower, as tulips were so expensive at the time. Each vase can hold 15 tulips. It is unusual to see tulip vases in pairs. This pair is unusual both for its age and condition, and was purchased by the museum in 1975 after the vases were put on display by Aronson Antiquairs of Amsterdam at an art fair hosted by the museum itself. Each vase was made in four separate pieces. The assembly consists of a foot-piece, a vase that rest on it, and a double-layered lid with tubular holes. These tubular holes are referred to as spouts, but were not used for pouring. The lids fit into each other and were designed to hold 8 and 7 individual blooms respectively.

The Greek A factory was known for its decorative table objects, but also became known for its extravagant tower vases, that held many more flowers. These tower vases would have been very costly to have filled completely. Tulips were very difficult to propagate and were considered quite expensive, though no longer as expensive as they had been during tulip mania when speculation in the market for flower bulbs caused several well-to-do growers to go bankrupt in the 1630s.

It is unknown who designed this specific pair of vases, but a similar vase in the collection of the Metropolitan Museum of Art without the foot piece was designed by Daniel Marot for the Greek A factory during the period of Adrianus Koecks, who is documented working there during the years 1689–1694.

A replica of a tulip pyramid vase made by De Griekse A in this period was used as a backdrop for President Obama's visit to the Netherlands in 2014. Each tier of the vase containing spouts is a separate piece. While the paired vases have two tiers, pyramid vases can have 10 or more tiers of spouts.

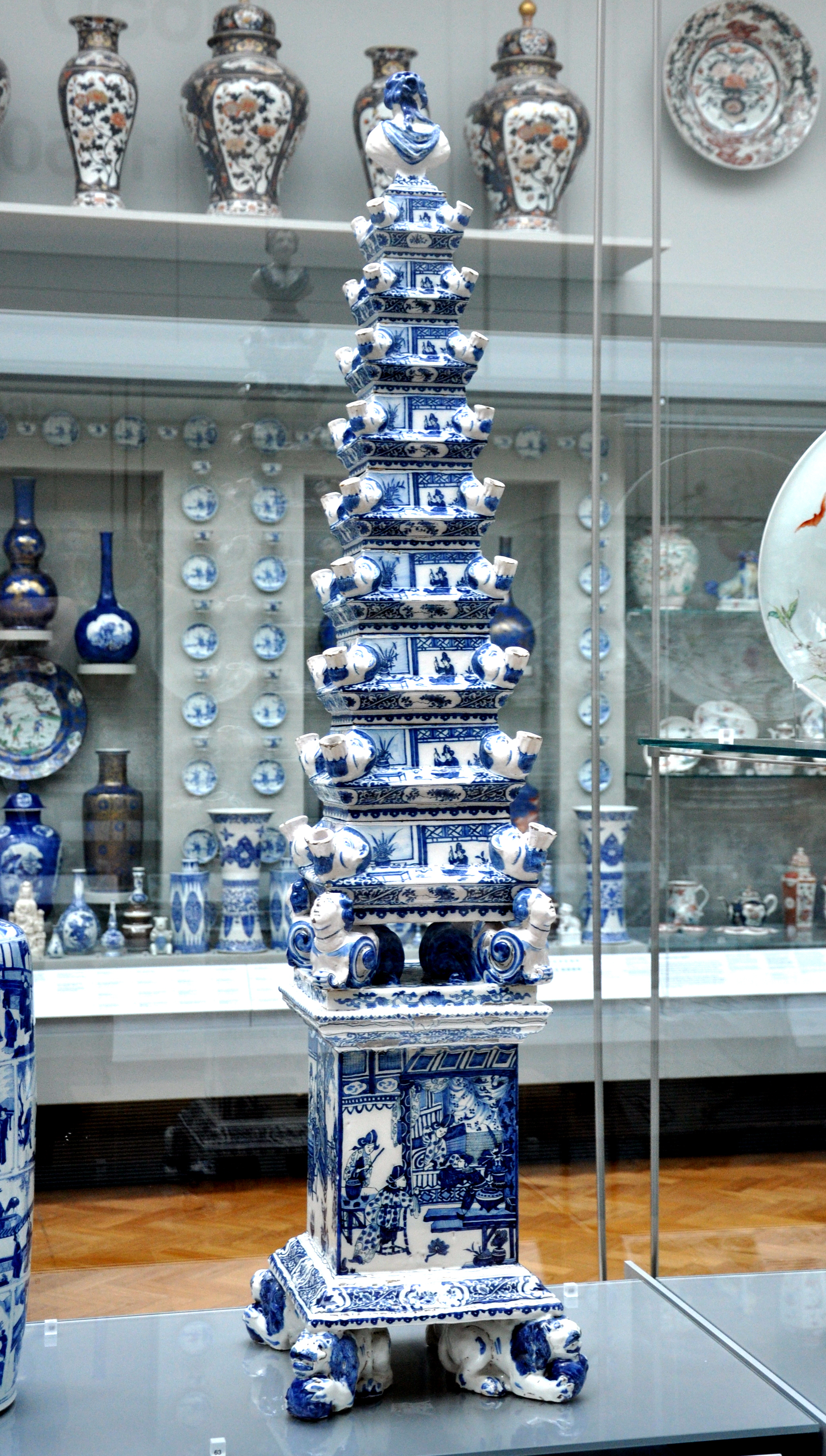
Tulip pyramid in the collection of the Victoria & Albert Museum, c. 1695

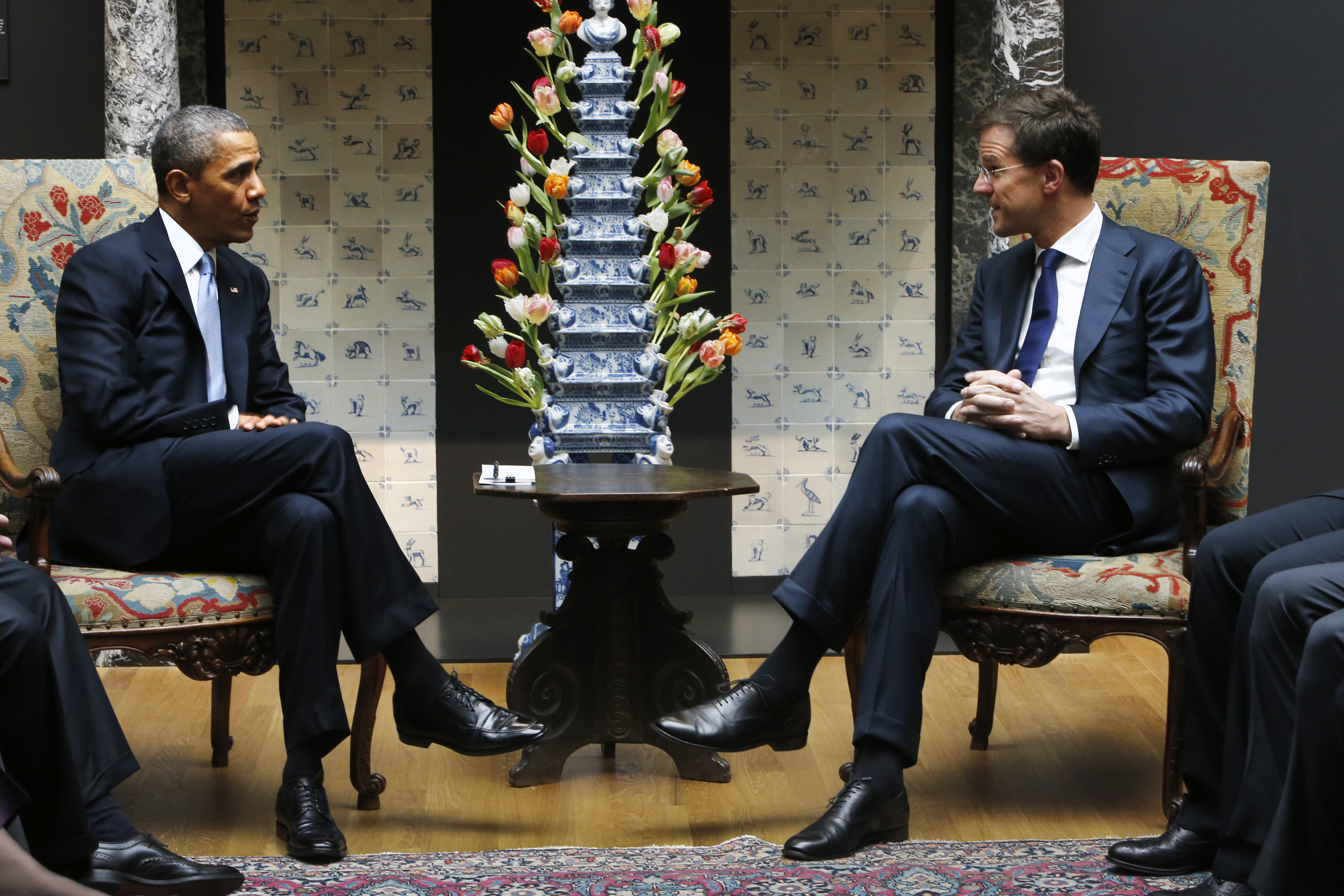
Obama's chat with Mark Rutte during his visit to the Netherlands in 2014
