= Delftware =

Dutch pottery

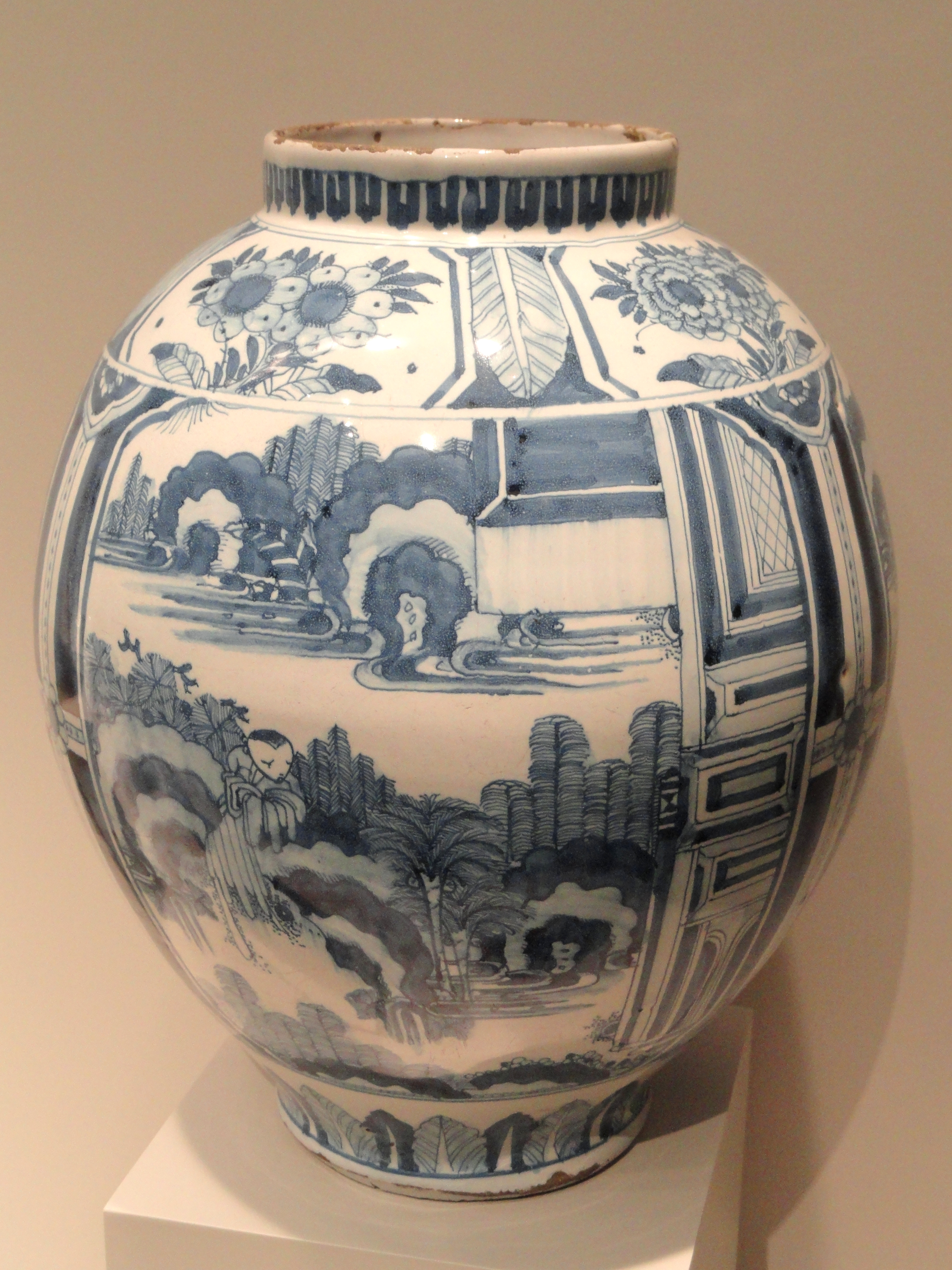
Vase in a Japanese style, c. 1680, Delft

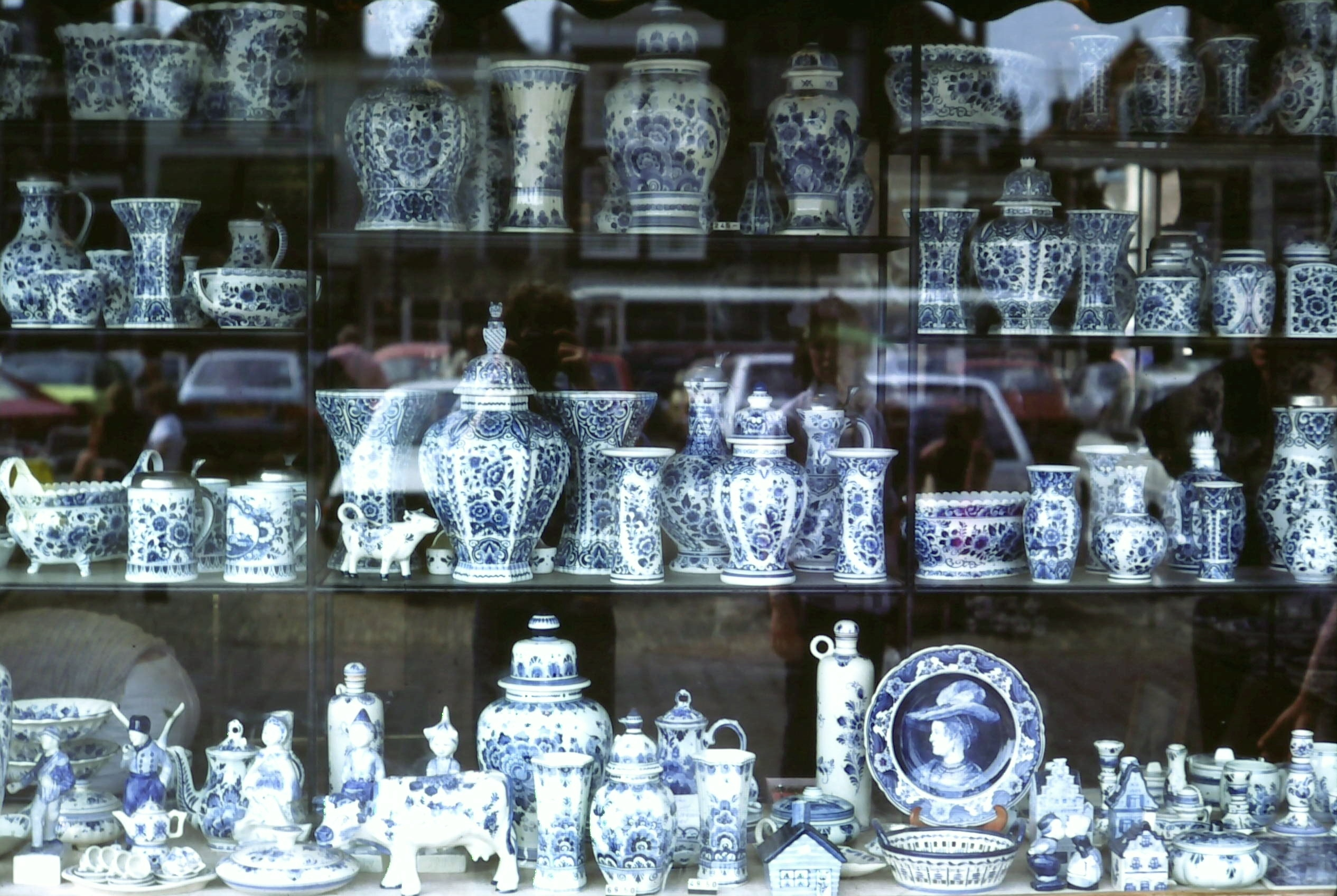
Window display of Delftware in the market place, Delft

Delftware or Delft pottery, also known as Delft Blue (Dutch: Delfts blauw) or as delf, is a general term now used for Dutch tin-glazed earthenware, a form of faience. Most of it is blue and white pottery, and the city of Delft in the Netherlands was the major centre of production, but the term covers wares with other colours, and made elsewhere. It is also used for similar pottery, English delftware. Delftware belongs to the global family of blue and white pottery, featuring variations of plant-based decorations that originated in Abbasid Iraq and were later popularised in Europe via Chinese adaptations.

Delftware is one of the types of tin-glazed pottery in which a white glaze is applied and usually decorated with metal oxides. In particular, the cobalt oxide is used for its ability to withstand high firing temperatures, allowing it to be applied under this glaze. Cobalt oxide is also what gives Delftware its trademark blue designs.

Delftware includes pottery objects of all descriptions, such as plates, vases, figurines and other ornamental forms, and tiles. The style originated around 1600, and the most highly regarded period of production is about 1640–1740, but Delftware continues to be produced. In the 17th and 18th centuries the manufacture of Delftware was a major industry, with product exported all over Europe.

== History ==
The earliest tin-glazed pottery in the Netherlands was made in Antwerp where the Italian potter Guido da Savino settled in 1500, and in the 16th century Italian maiolica was the main influence on decorative styles. The manufacture of painted pottery spread from Antwerp to the northern Netherlands, in particular after the Fall of Antwerp in 1585 when a large part of the protestant population fled to the north. Production developed in Middelburg and Haarlem in the 1570s, and in Amsterdam in the 1580s. Much of the finer work was produced in Delft, but simple everyday tin-glazed pottery was made in places such as Gouda, Rotterdam, Haarlem, Amsterdam and Dordrecht.

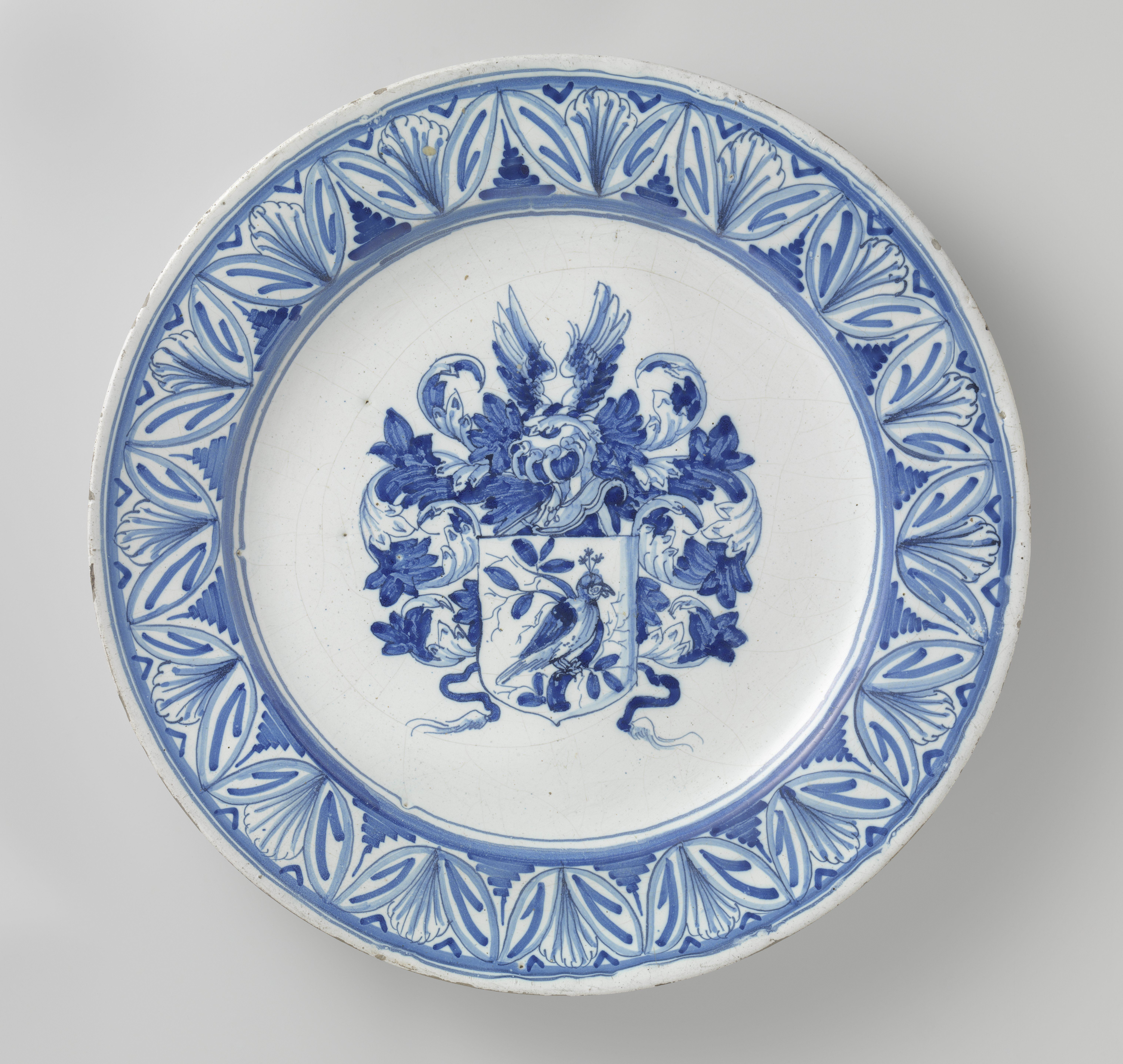
"Armorial Dish" (wapenbord) by Willem Jansz. Verstraeten, c. 1645–1655, Haarlem

The main period of tin-glaze pottery in the Netherlands was 1640–1740. From about 1640 Delft potters began using personal monograms and distinctive factory marks. The Guild of St Luke, to which painters in all media had to belong, admitted ten master potters in the thirty years between 1610 and 1640, and twenty in the nine years 1651 to 1660. In 1654 a gunpowder explosion in Delft destroyed many breweries and as the brewing industry was in decline, they became available to pottery makers looking for larger premises; some retained the old brewery names, e.g. The Double Tankard, The Young Moors' Head, and The Three Bells.

From about 1615, the potters began to coat their pots completely in white tin glaze instead of covering only the painting surface and coating the rest with clear ceramic glaze. They then began to cover the tin-glaze with clear glaze, which gave depth to the fired surface and smoothness to cobalt blues, ultimately creating a good resemblance to porcelain.

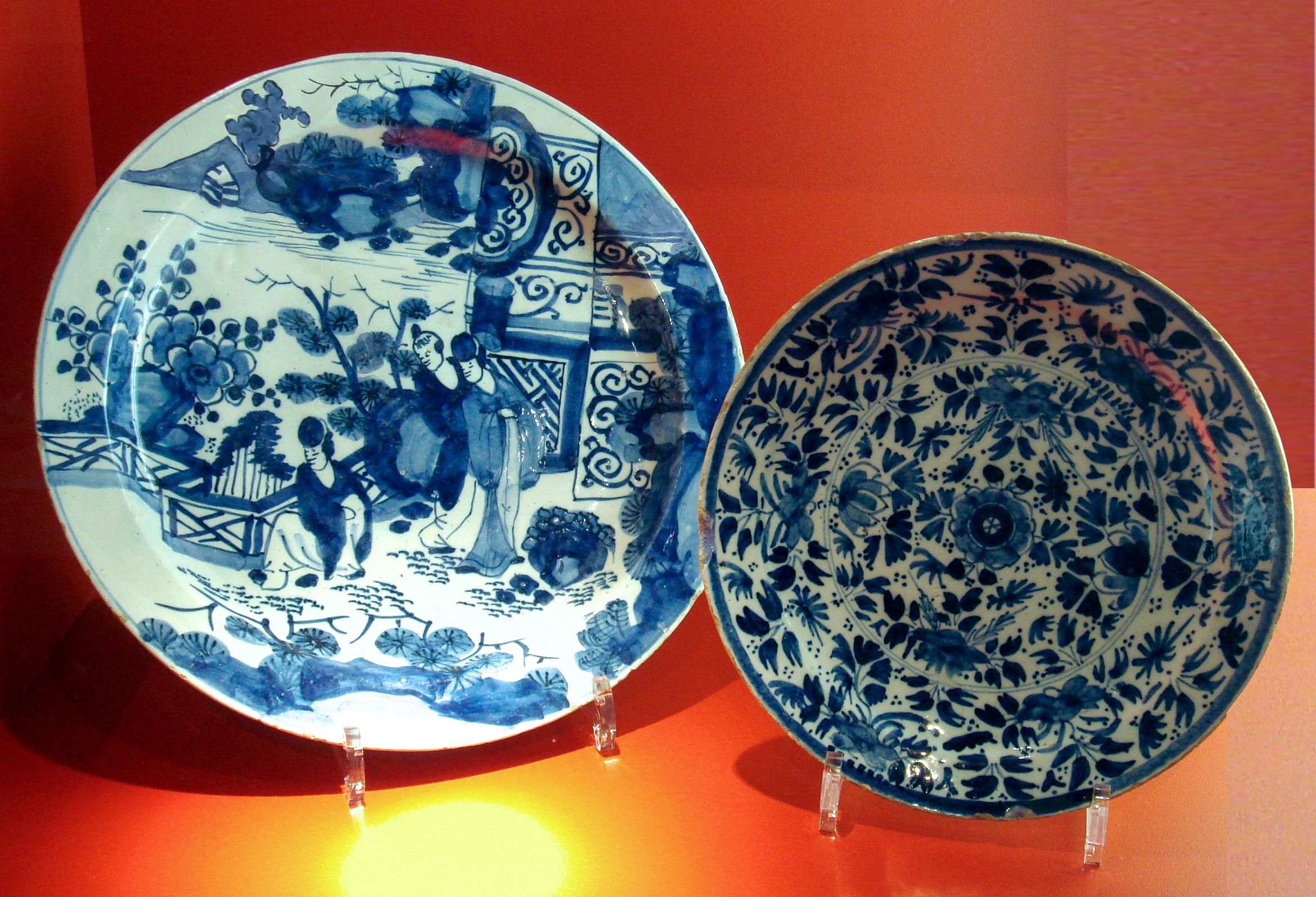
18th century Delftware, the plate at left with a Japanese scene

During the Dutch Golden Age, the Dutch East India Company had a lively trade with the East and imported millions of pieces of Chinese porcelain in the early 17th century. The Chinese workmanship and attention to detail impressed many. Only the richest could afford the early imports. Dutch potters did not immediately imitate Chinese porcelain; they began to do so after the death of the Wanli Emperor in 1620, when the supply to Europe was interrupted. "Potters now saw an opportunity to produce a cheap alternative for Chinese porcelain. After much experimenting they managed to make a thin type of earthenware which was covered with a white tin glaze. Although made of low-fired earthenware, it resembled porcelain amazingly well."

Delftware inspired by Chinese originals persisted from about 1630 to the mid-18th century alongside European patterns. Later, after Japanese Imari ware had become popular in the late 1600s and early 1700s (when it too tried to fill the gap of the Chinese shortage), Delft began making their own 'Imari ware' copying the classic 'flower vase on a terrace surrounded by three panels with cranes and pine design'. Oriental styles in Delftware remained popular into the early 1700s but then declined when Chinese porcelain became available again.

Some regard Delftware from about 1750 onwards as artistically inferior. Caiger-Smith says that most of the later wares "were painted with clever, ephemeral decoration. Little trace of feeling or originality remained to be lamented when, at the end of the eighteenth century, the Delftware potteries began to go out of business." By this time Delftware potters had lost their market to British porcelain and the new white earthenware.

Delft Blue pottery formed the basis of one of British Airways' ethnic tailfins. The design, Delftblue Daybreak, was applied to 17 aircraft.

== Guilds and factories ==
Some Dutch potters belonged to the artisan Guild of Saint Luke during the 1600s.

Of thirty factories, one or two remain: the Royal Tichelaar (Koninklijke Tichelaar Makkum) factory in Makkum, Friesland, founded in 1594, and De Koninklijke Porceleyne Fles ("The Royal Porcelain Bottle") factory in Delft founded in 1653, the latter of which is credited with reviving the Delftware industry. The Royal Tichelaar factory in Makkum continues the production of tin-glazed earthenware.

Another notable factory was De Grieksche A (The Greek A), founded in 1658 by Wouter van Eenhorn.

Today, Delfts Blauw (Delft Blue) is the brand name hand painted on the bottom of ceramic pieces identifying them as authentic and collectible.

== Materials and methods ==
Although most Delft Blue borrows from the tin-glaze tradition, it is nearly all decorated in underglaze blue on a white clay body and very little uses tin glaze, a more expensive product.

The use of marl, a type of clay rich in calcium compounds, allowed the Dutch potters to refine their technique and to make finer items. The usual clay body of Delftware was a blend of three clays, one local, one from Tournai and one from the Rhineland.

Around 1700 several factories were using enamel colours and gilding over the tin-glaze, requiring a third kiln firing at a lower temperature. Some potters, namely Samuel van Eenhoorn, began to use manganese violet to emphasise their designs—a technique unprecedented by Chinese porcelain.

Delftware ranged from simple household items – plain white earthenware with little or no decoration – to fancy artwork. Most of the Delft factories made sets of jars, the kast-stel set. Pictorial plates were made in abundance, illustrated with religious motifs, native Dutch scenes with windmills and fishing boats, hunting scenes, landscapes and seascapes. Sets of plates were made with the words and music of songs; dessert was served on them and when the plates were clear the company started singing. The Delft potters also made tiles in vast numbers (estimated at eight hundred million) over a period of two hundred years; many Dutch houses still have tiles that were fixed in the 17th and 18th centuries. Delftware became popular and was widely exported in Europe and even reached China and Japan. Chinese and Japanese potters made porcelain versions of Delftware for export to Europe. Early on, Dutch tiles took specific design and colour inspiration from Hispano-Mauresque as well as Italian ceramics.

== Object gallery ==
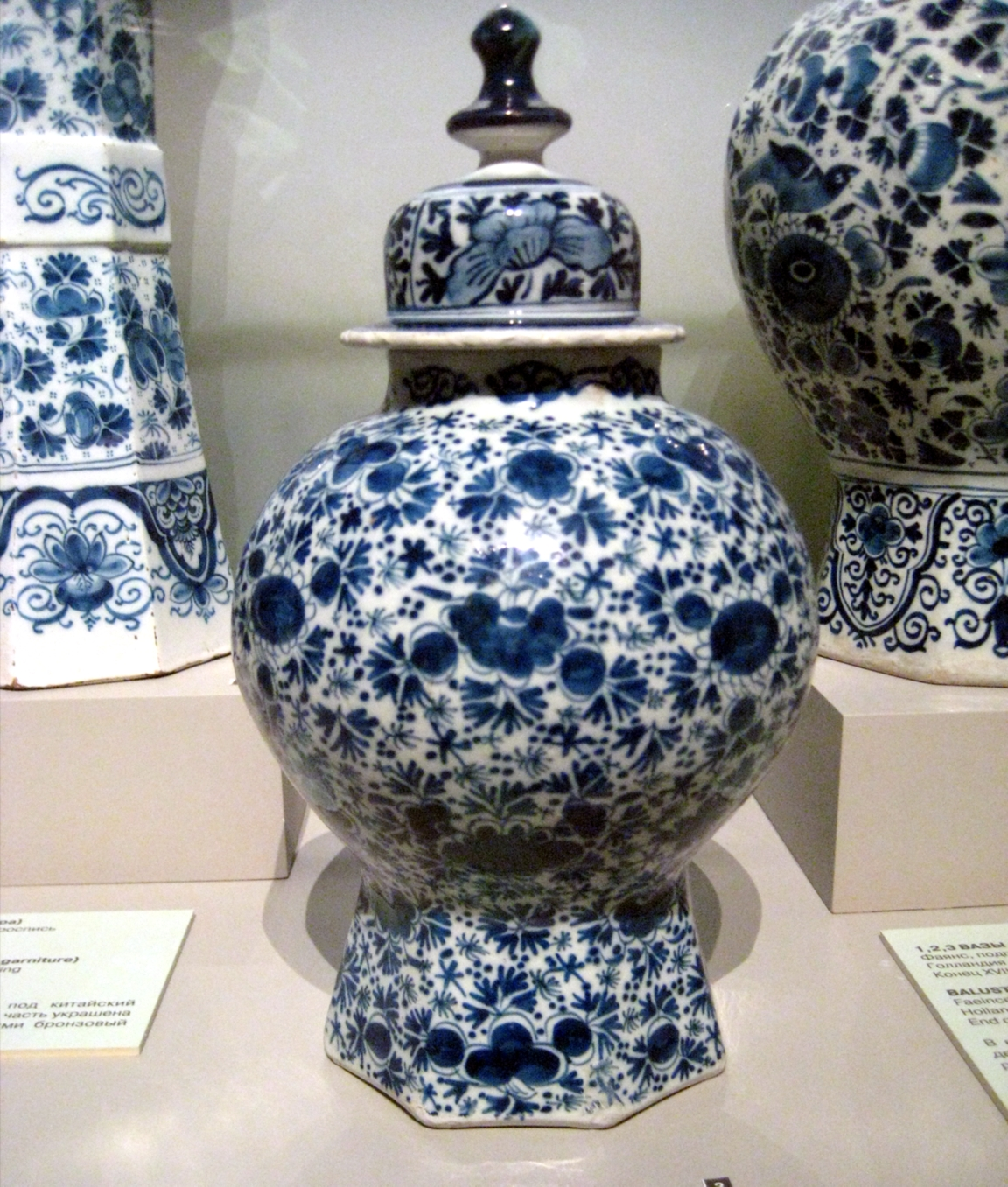
Delftware in Pushkin Art Museum, Russia

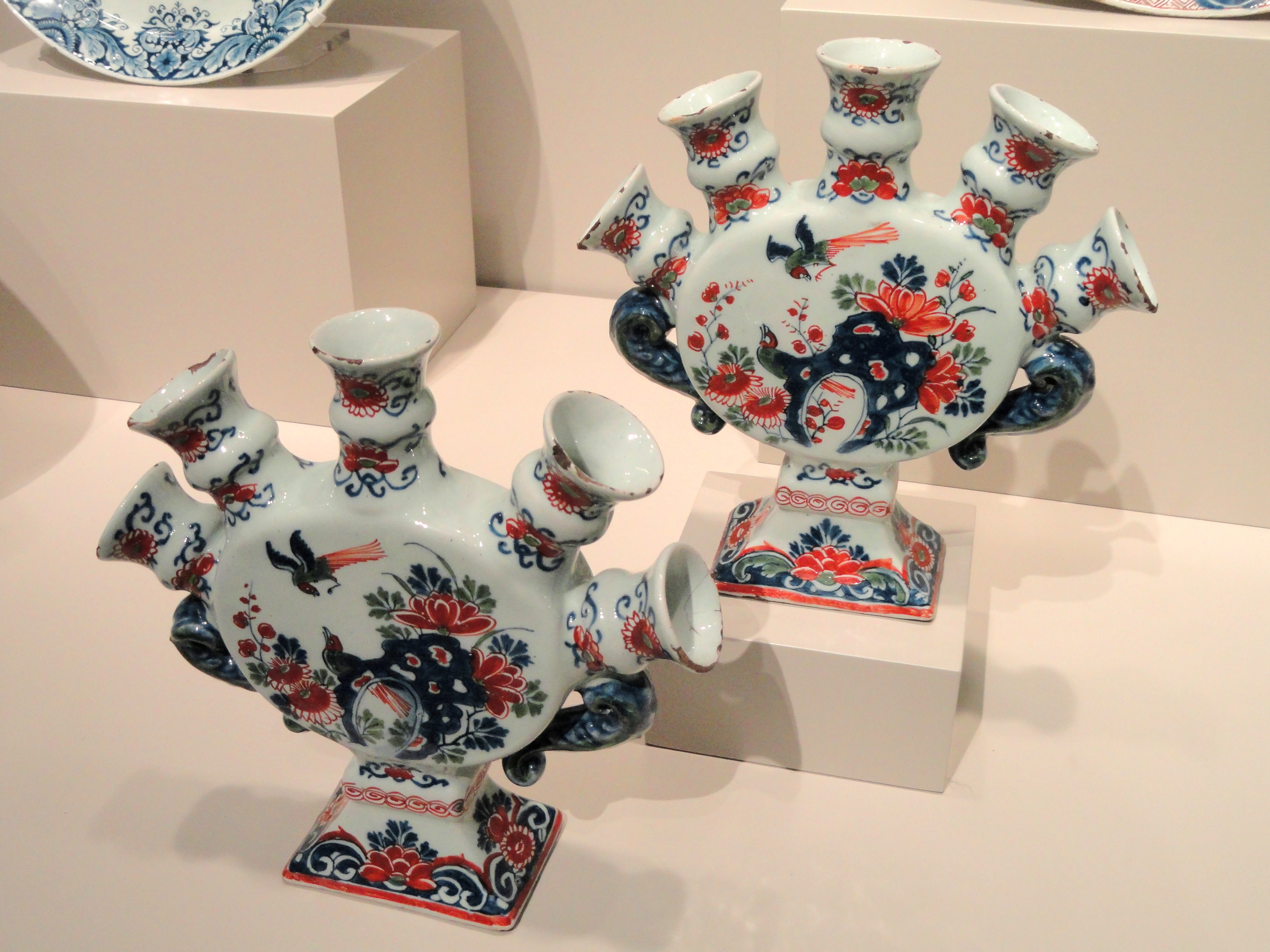
Two flower vases, early 18th century, Delft

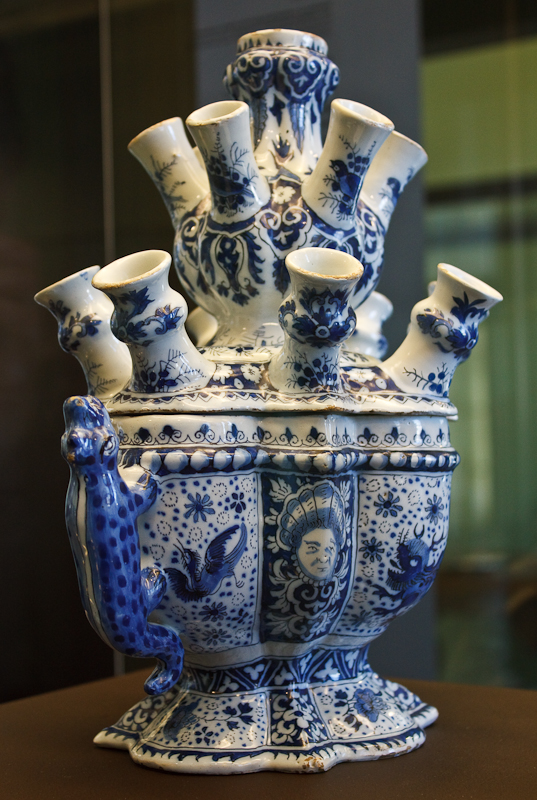
Tulip vase, Museum Boijmans Van Beuningen

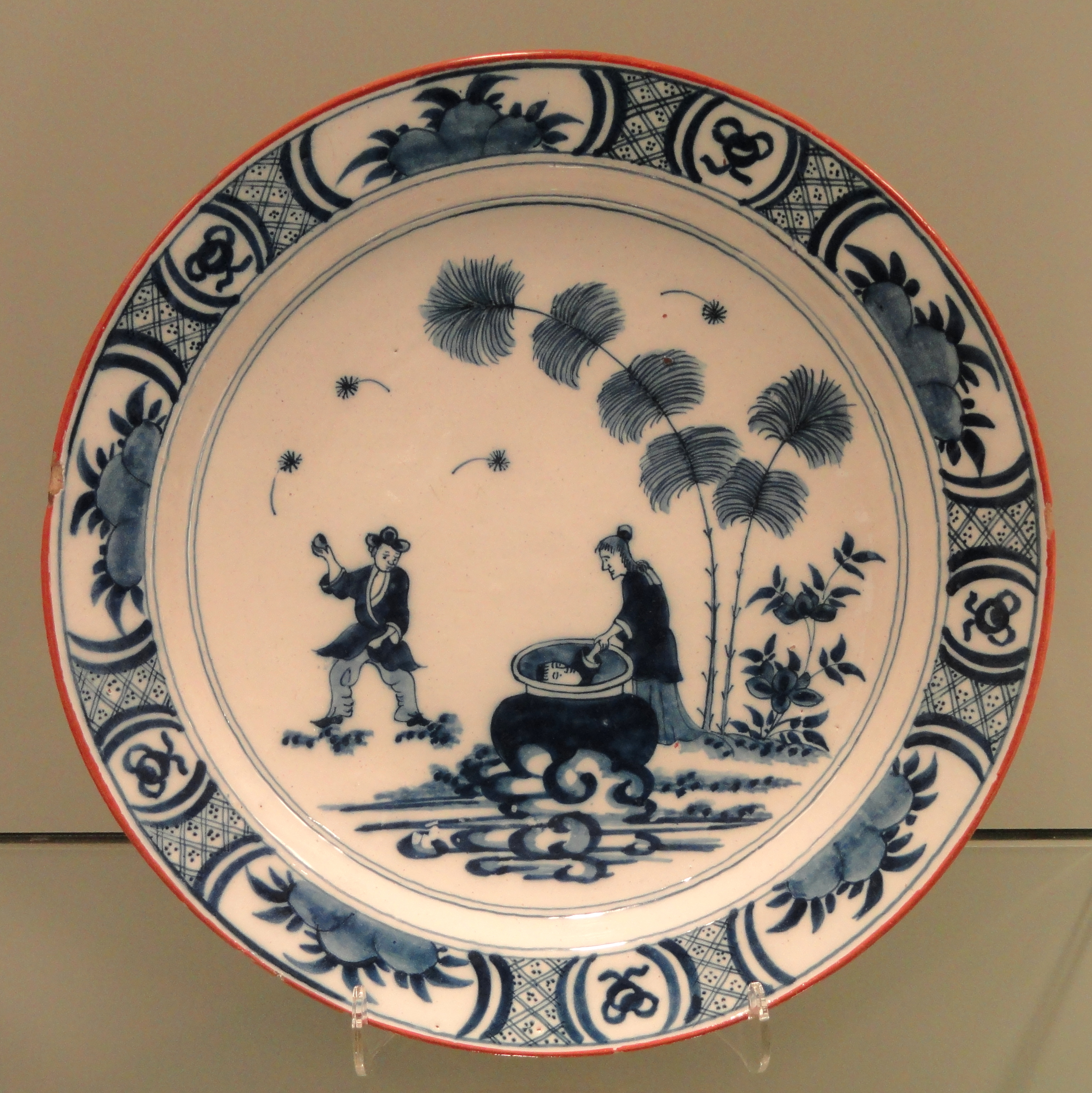
Charger with Shiba Onko Design, c. 1730, Delft

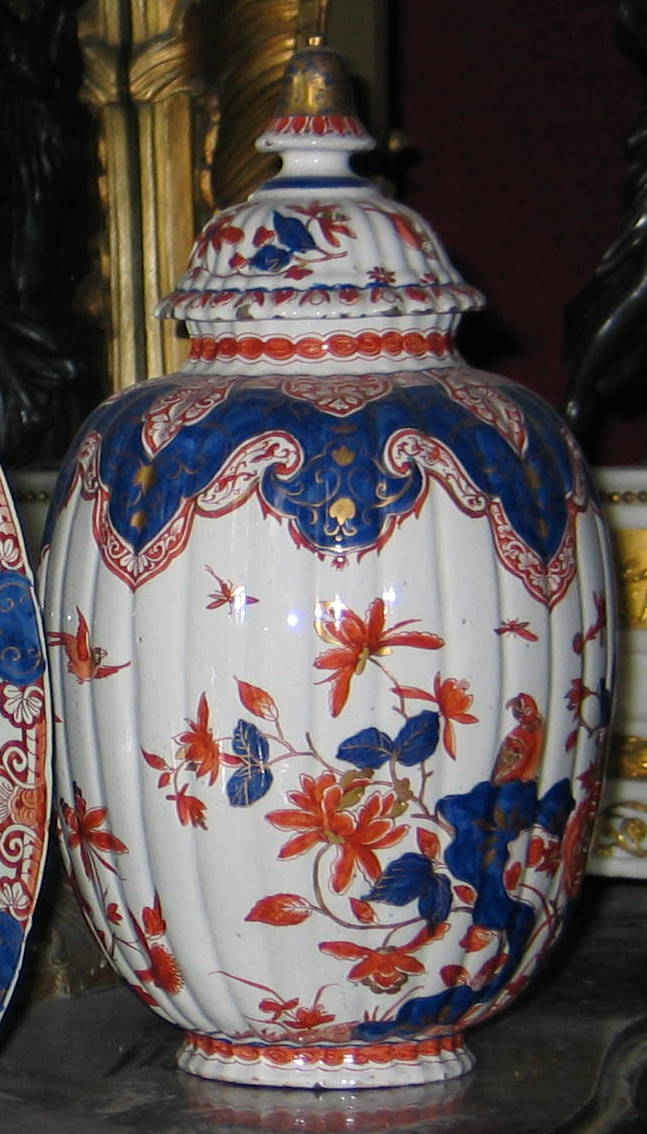
An imari-styled vase, manufactured in De Griekse A, c. 1700–1720, Museum Geelvinck-Hinlopen Huis

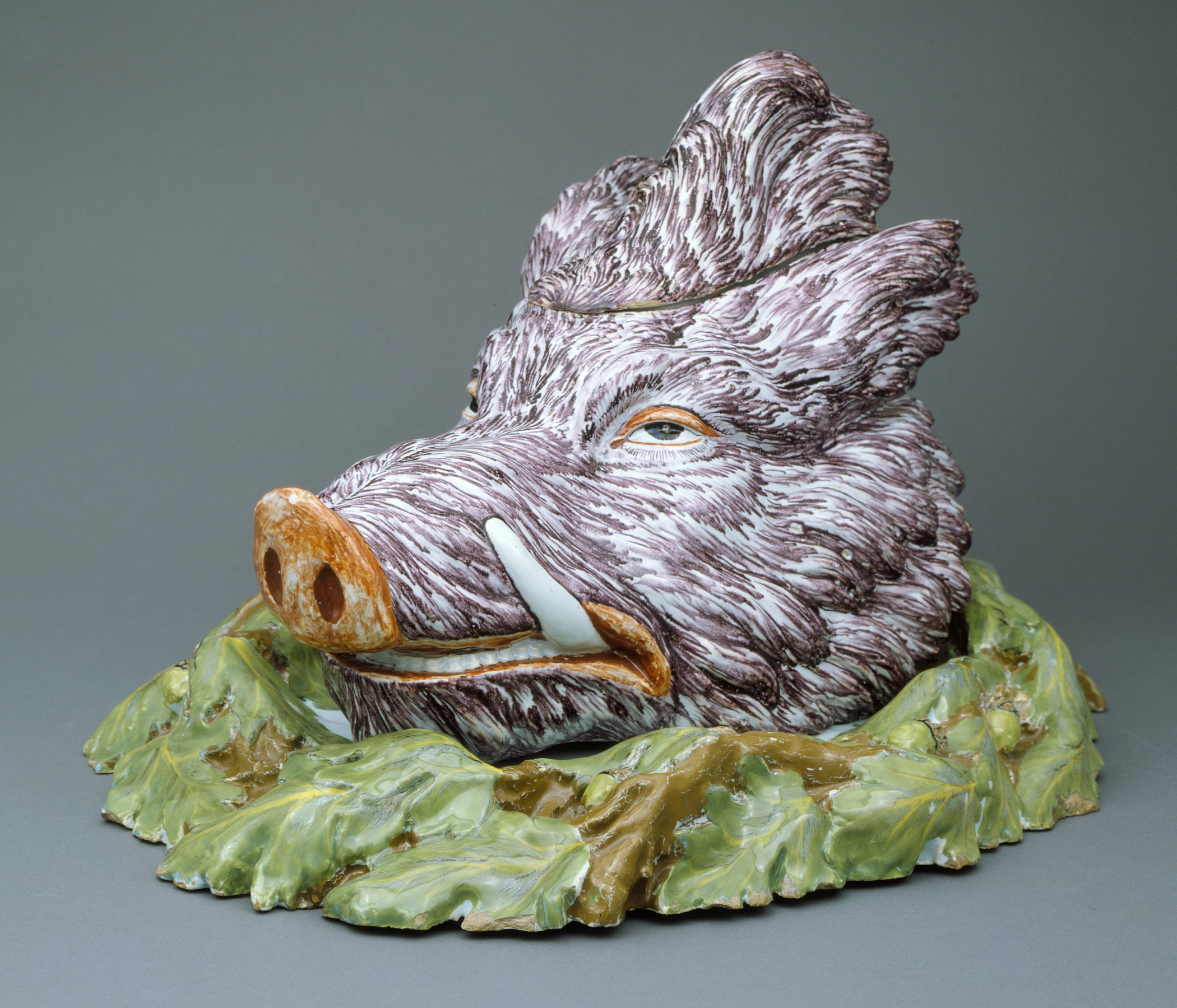
Boar's Head Tureen and Stand, c. 1750

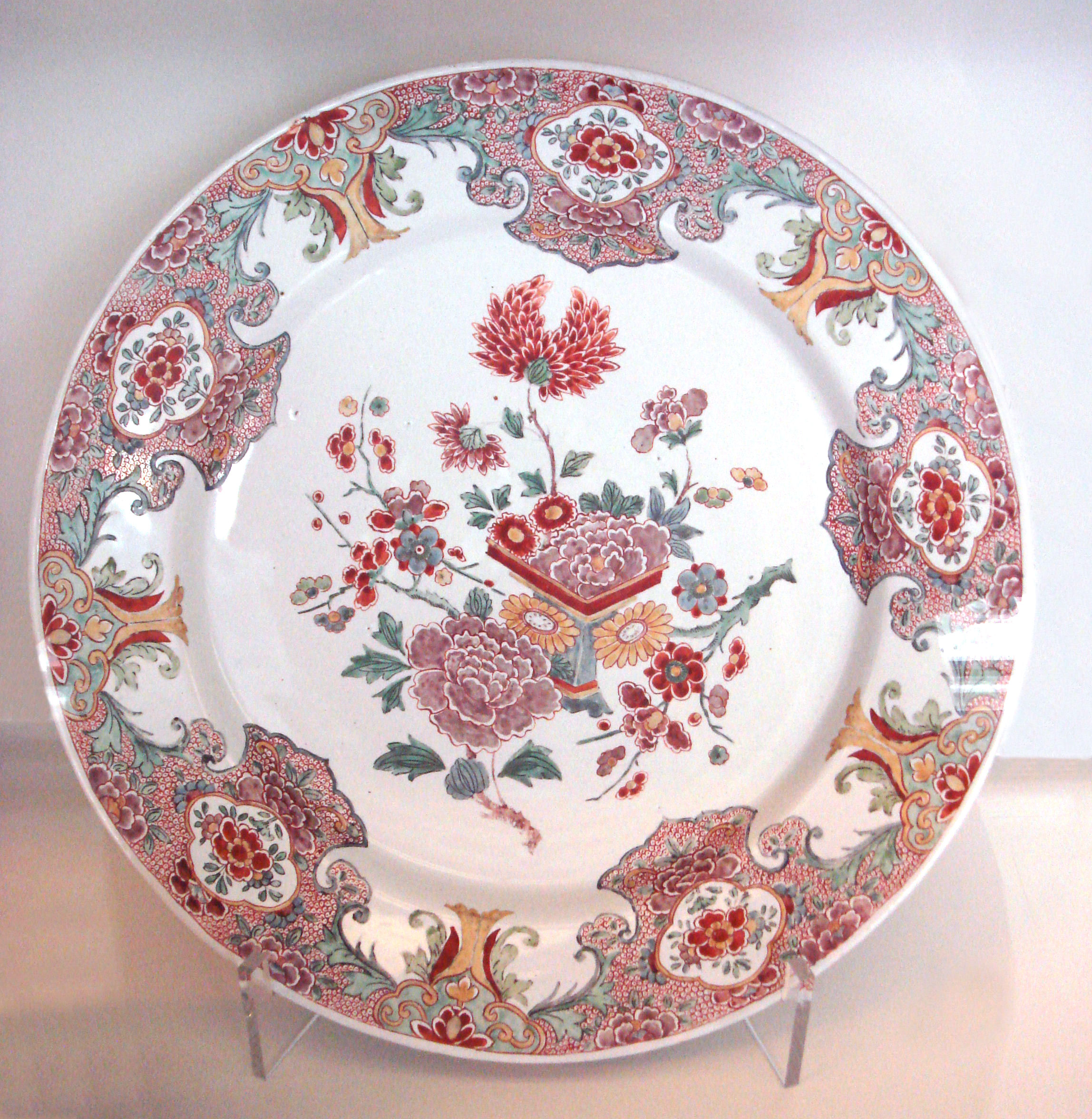
A famille rose plate, around 1770, Musée des Arts Décoratifs, Paris

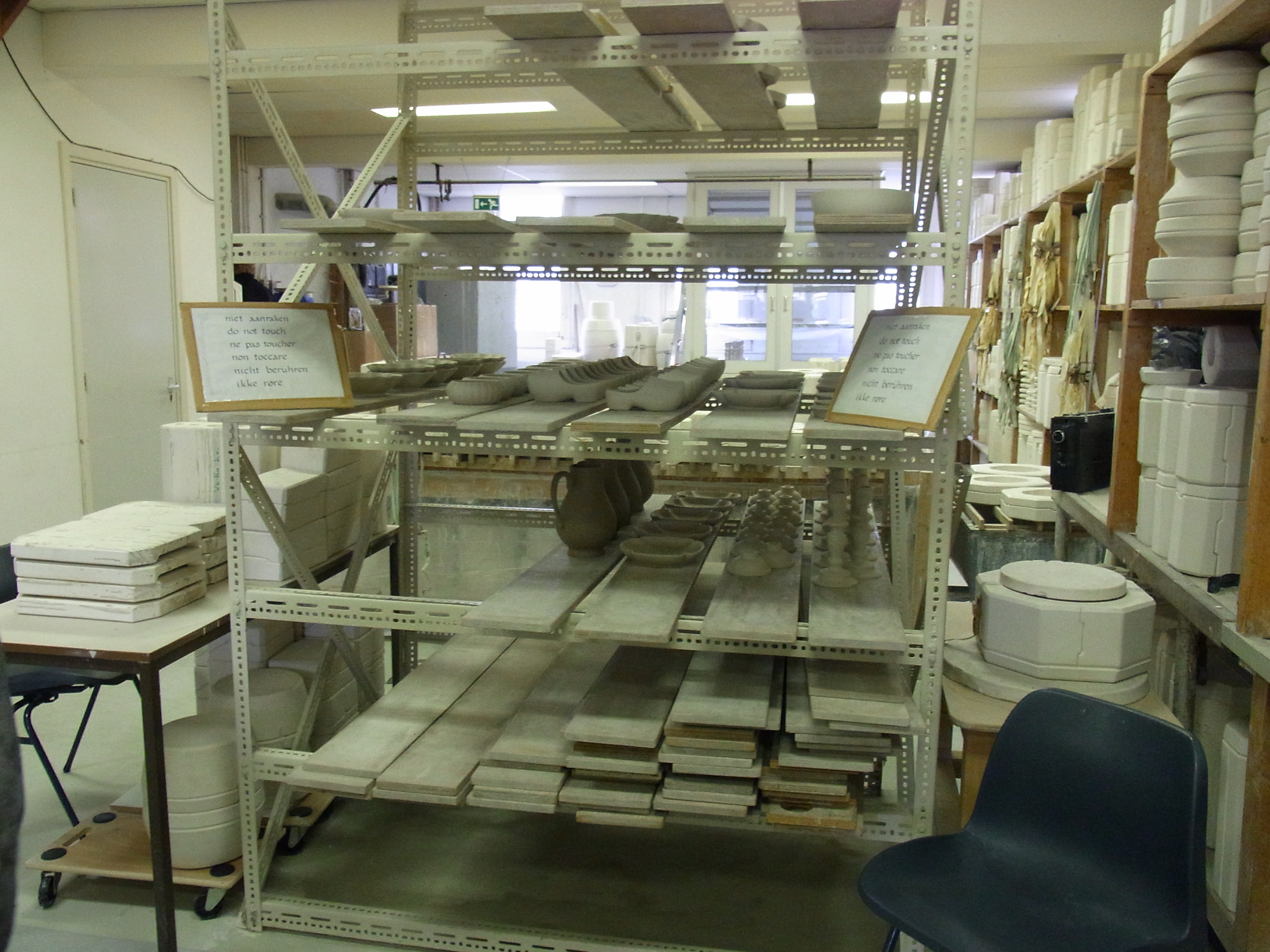
A ceramics workshop in Delftse Pauw

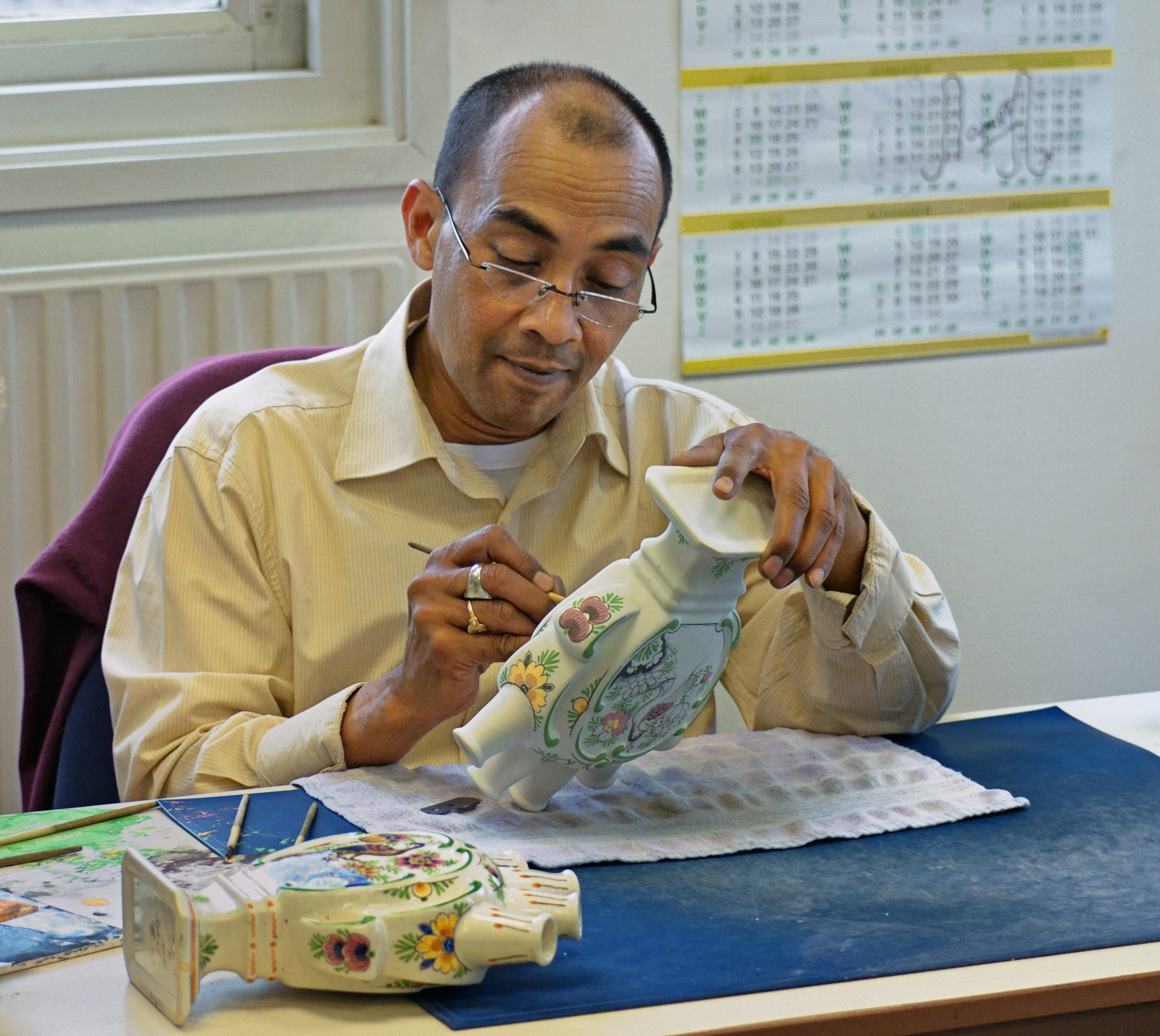
Painting of colour Delft pottery

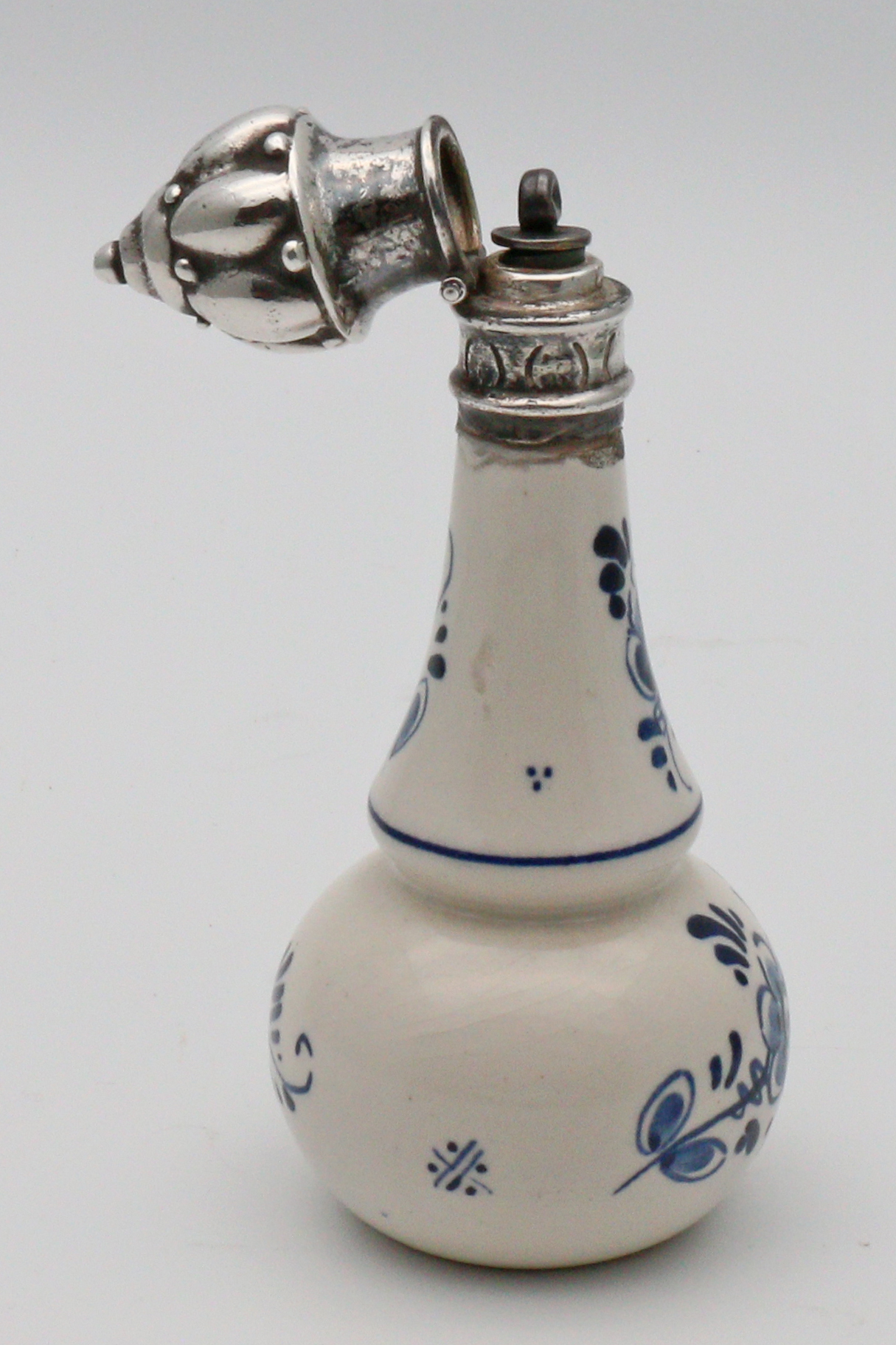
Schoonhoven silver topped scent bottle

== Tile gallery ==
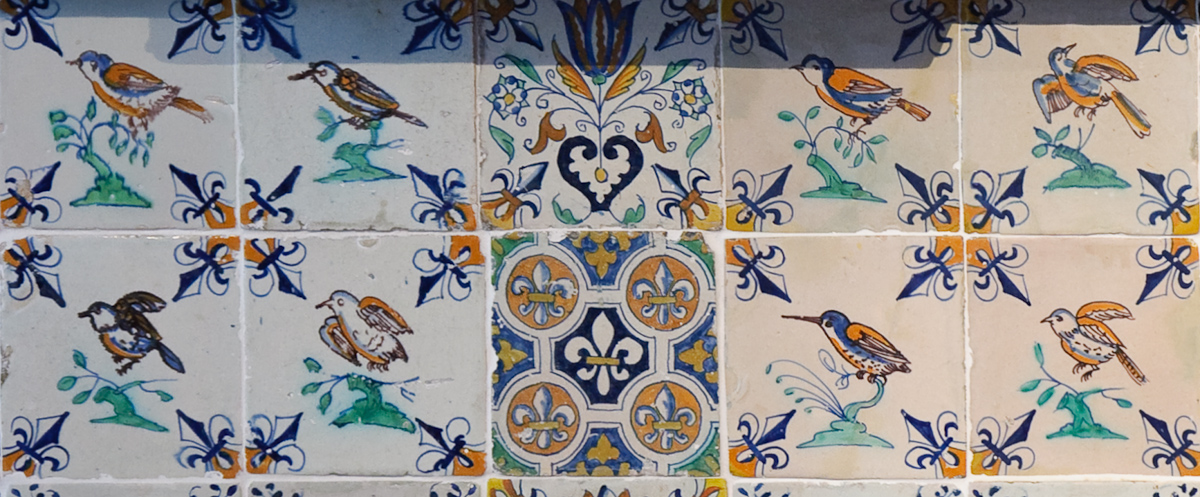
Museum of Friesland, Leeuwarden, Netherlands

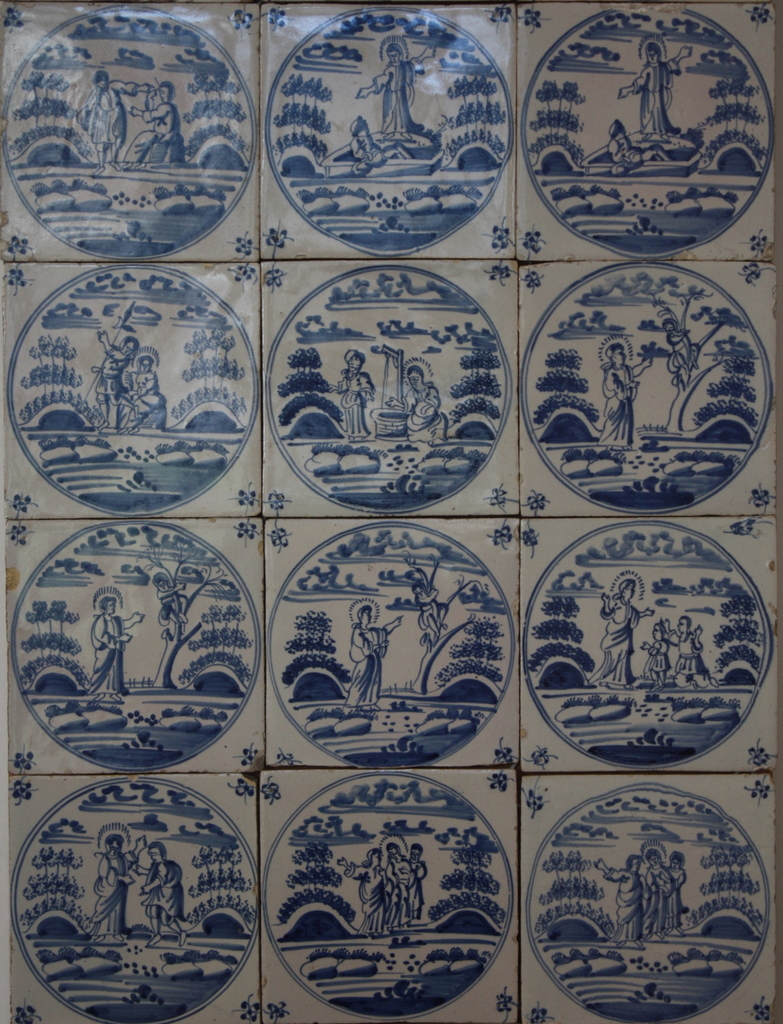
Biblical tiles, Museum of Gdańsk, Poland

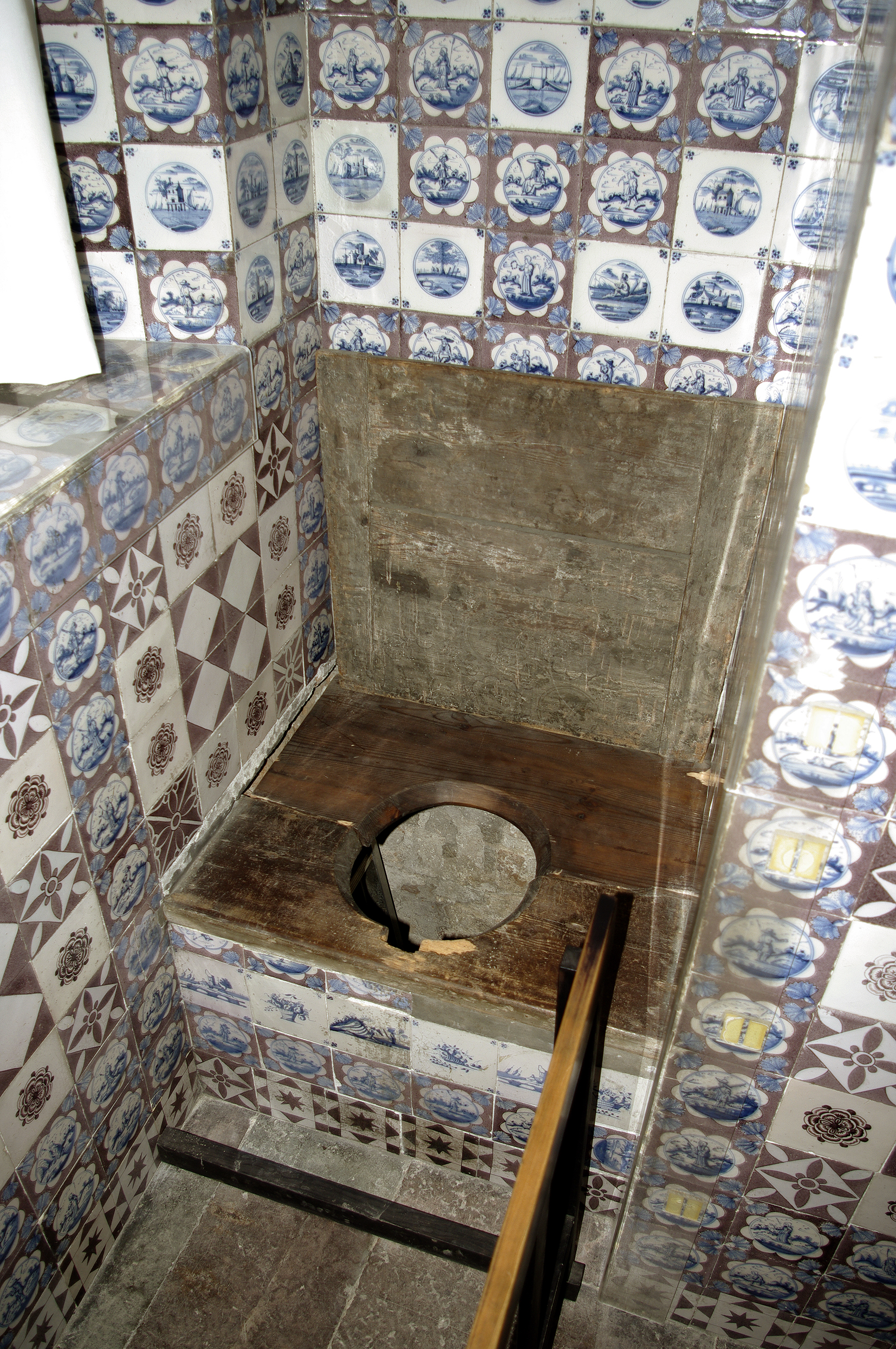
Toilet of Rosenborg Castle, Copenhagen

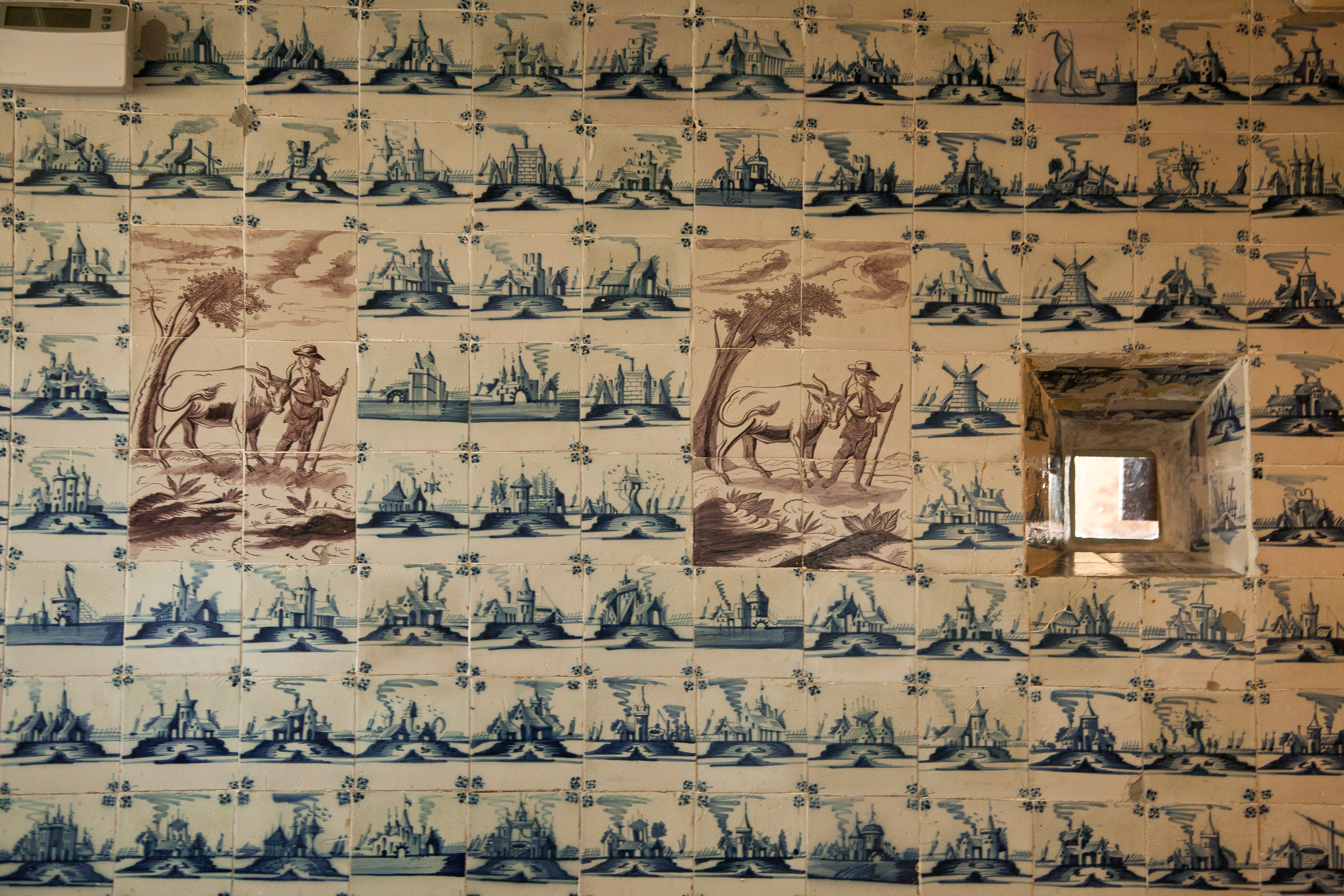
Farmhouse interior, Hoogland, near Utrecht

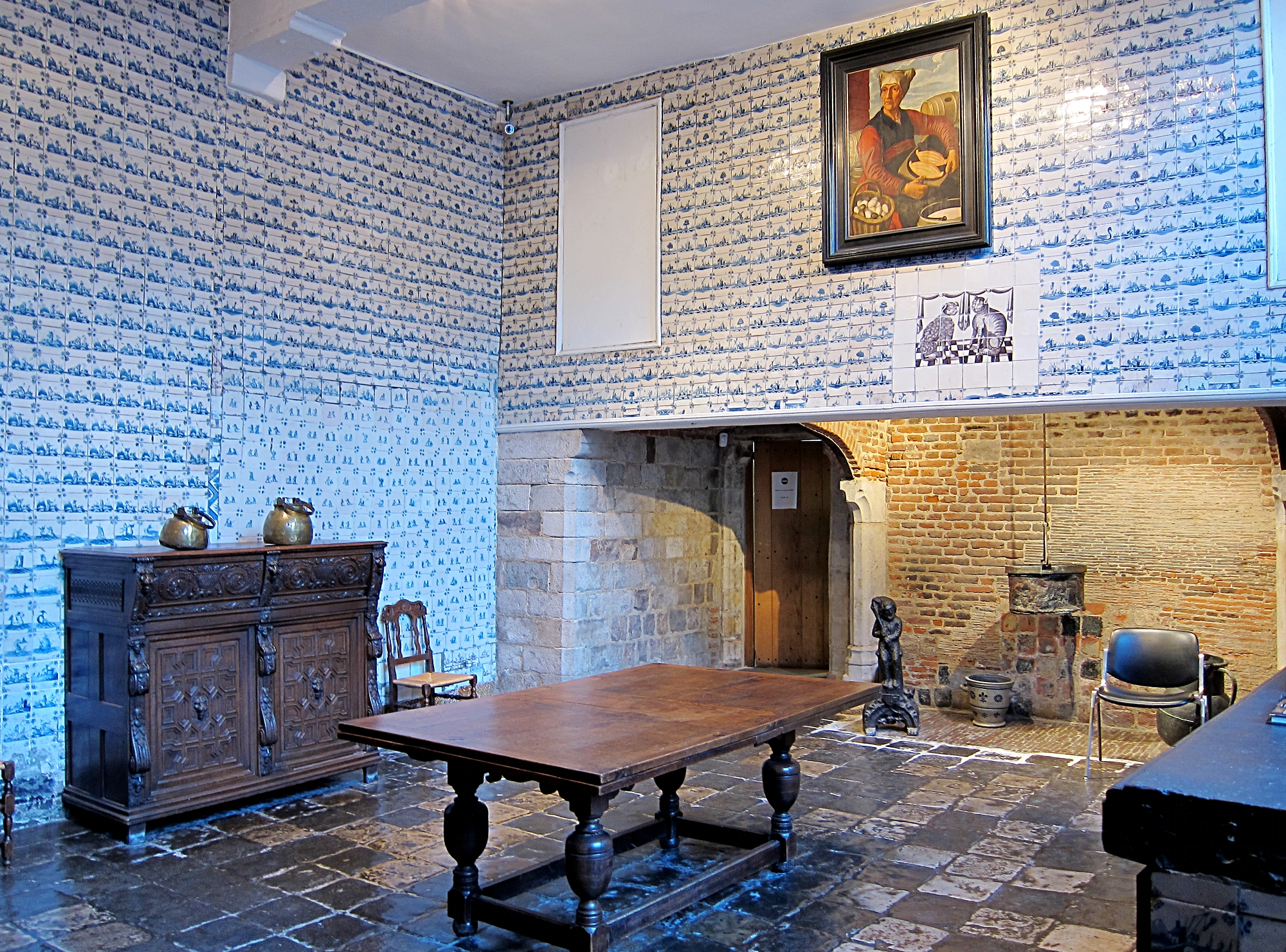
Kitchen of the Hospice Comtesse, Lille

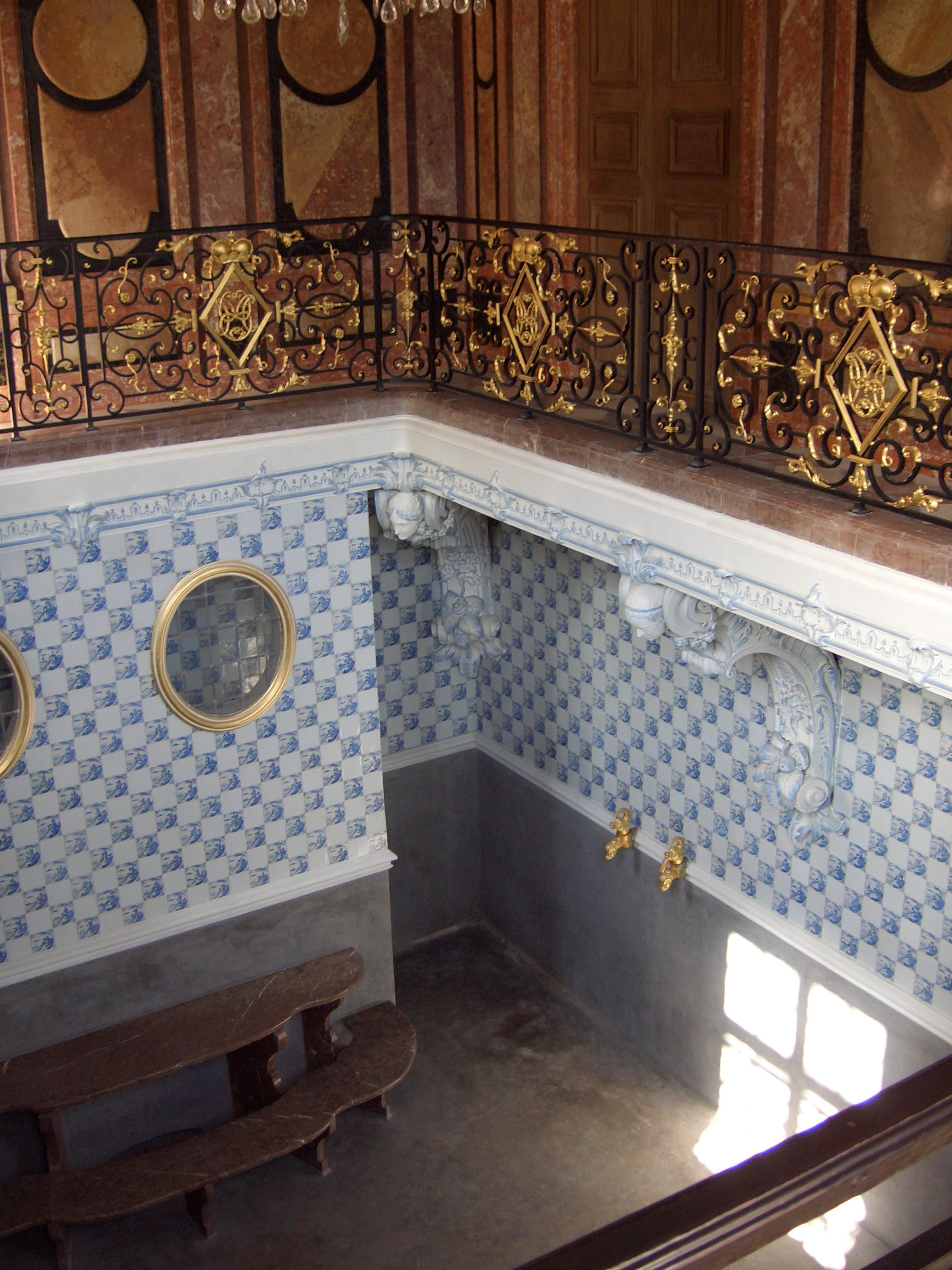
Swimming pool of Nymphenburg Palace, Munich

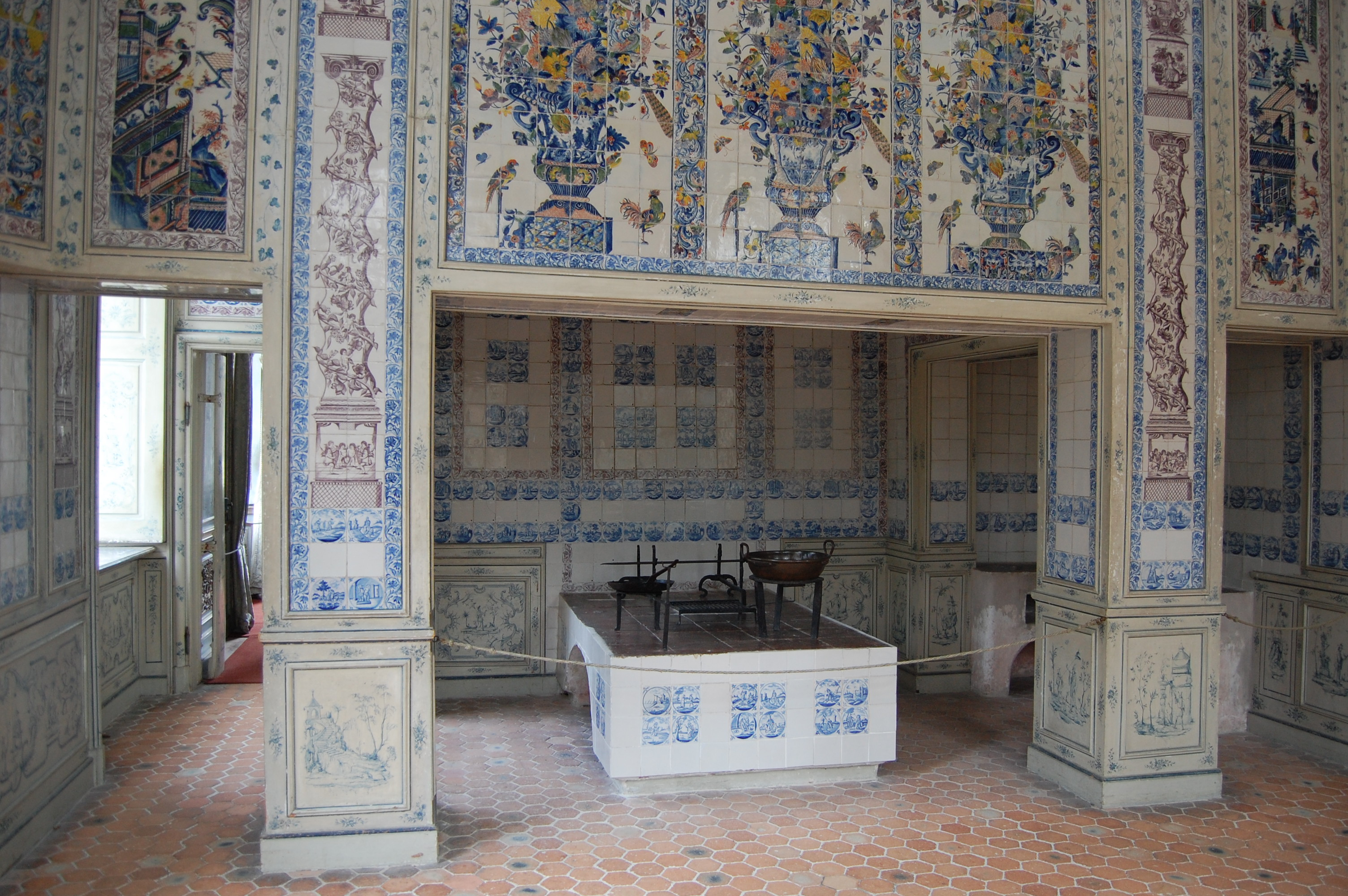
Kitchen of the Amalienburg, Nymphenburg Palace

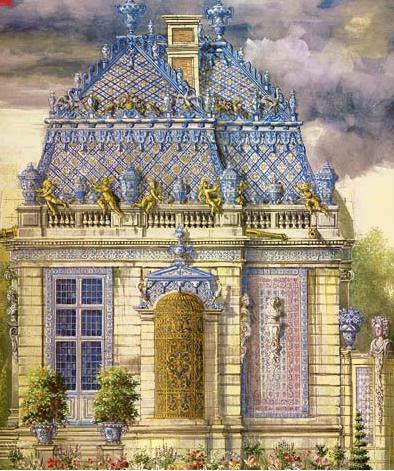
Reconstitution of the Trianon de Porcelaine, Versailles

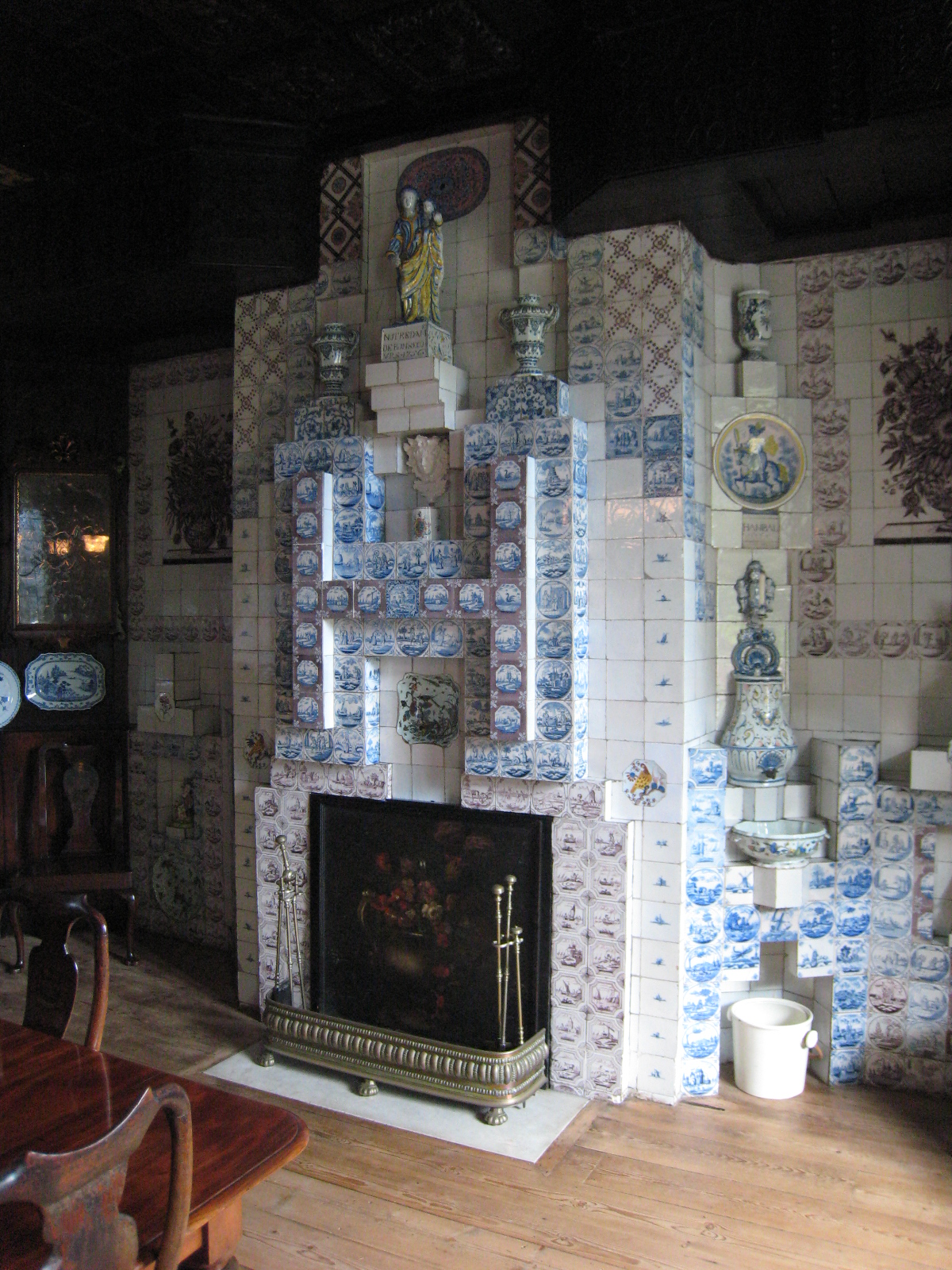
Victor Hugo's dining room, Hauteville House, Guernsey, 1860

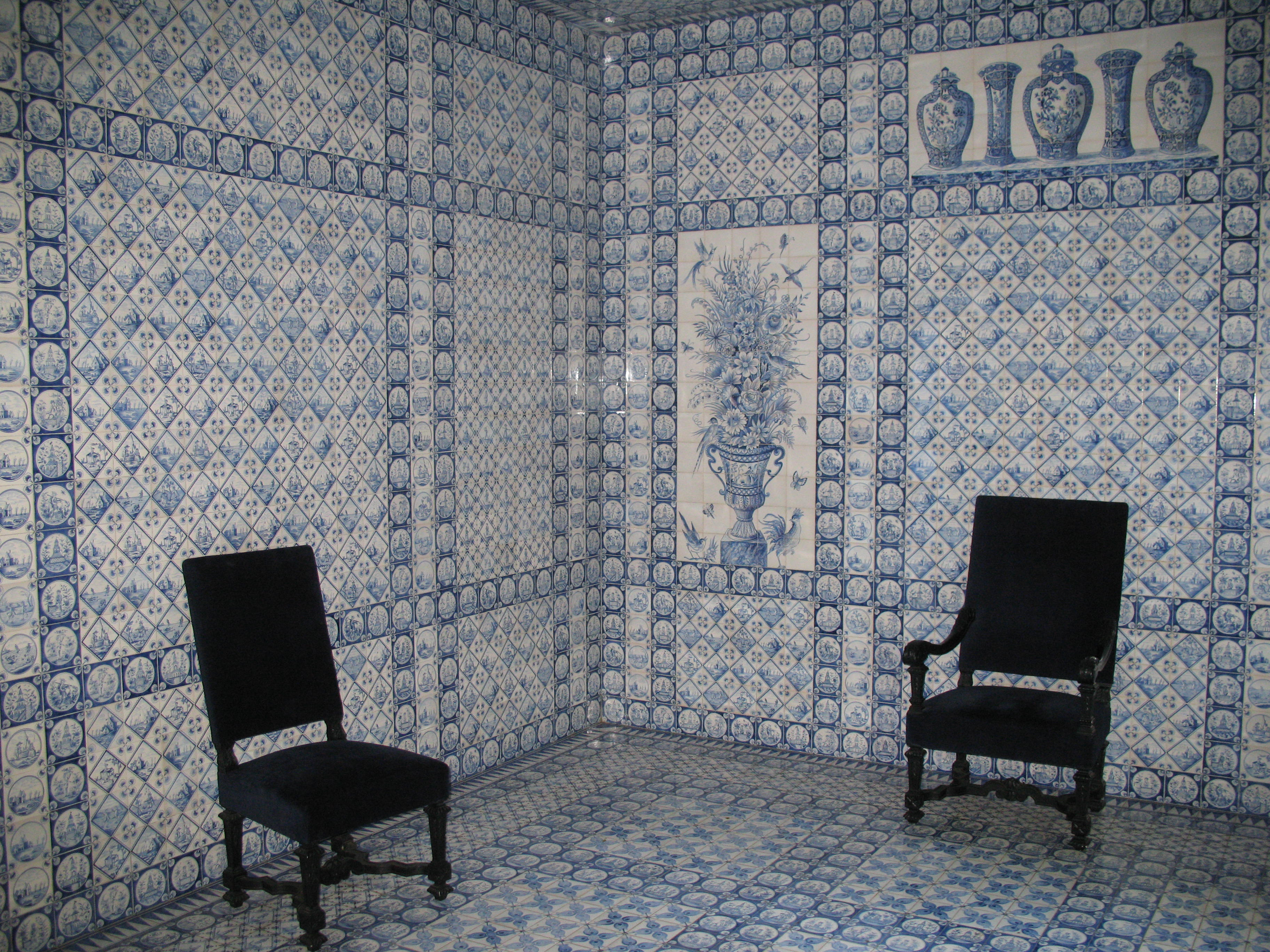
Château de Groussay, Montfort-l'Amaury near Paris, Tartar tent with 10,000 tiles, 1960

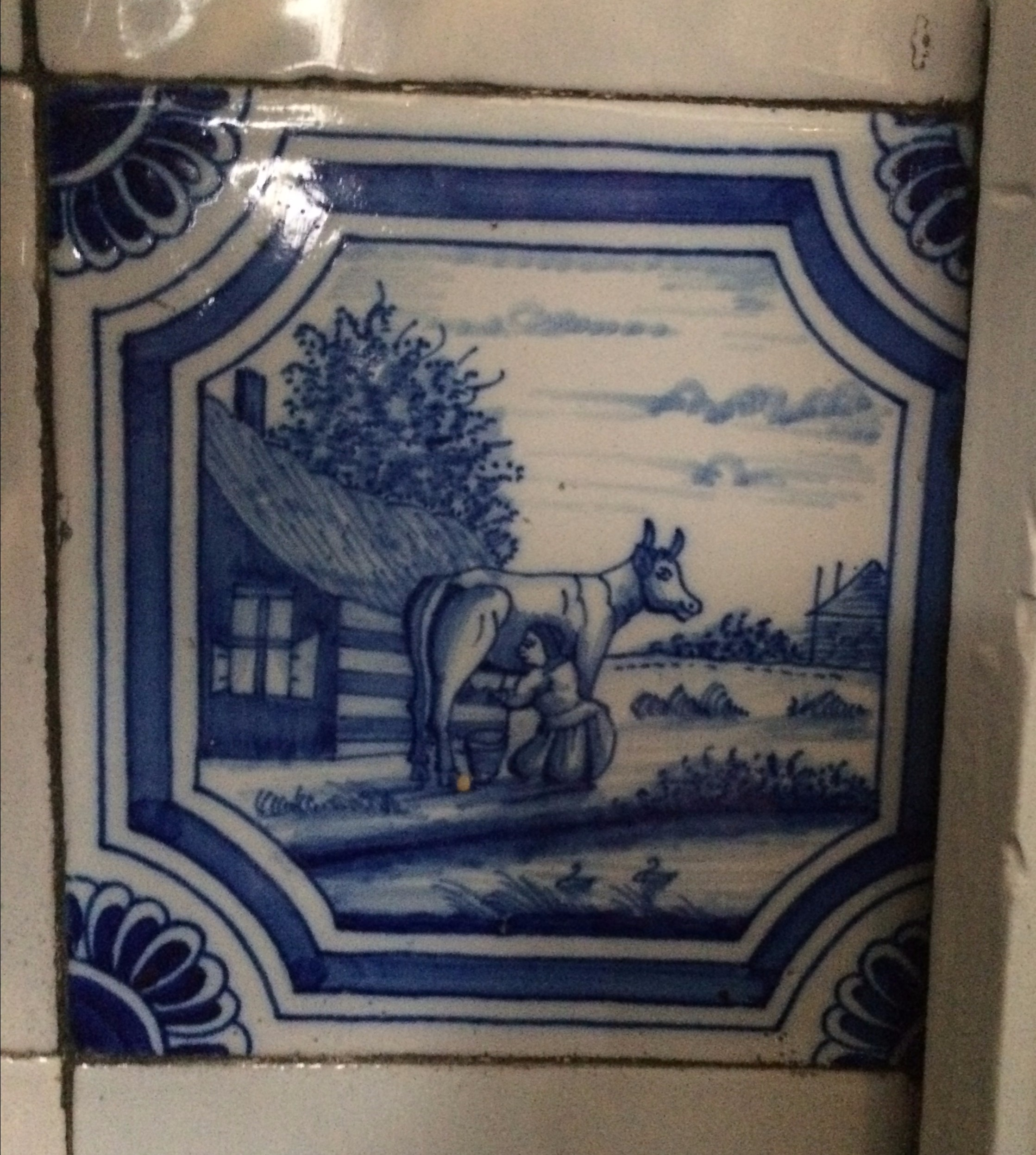
Braemar Castle, Cow & Milkmaid tile by fireplace.

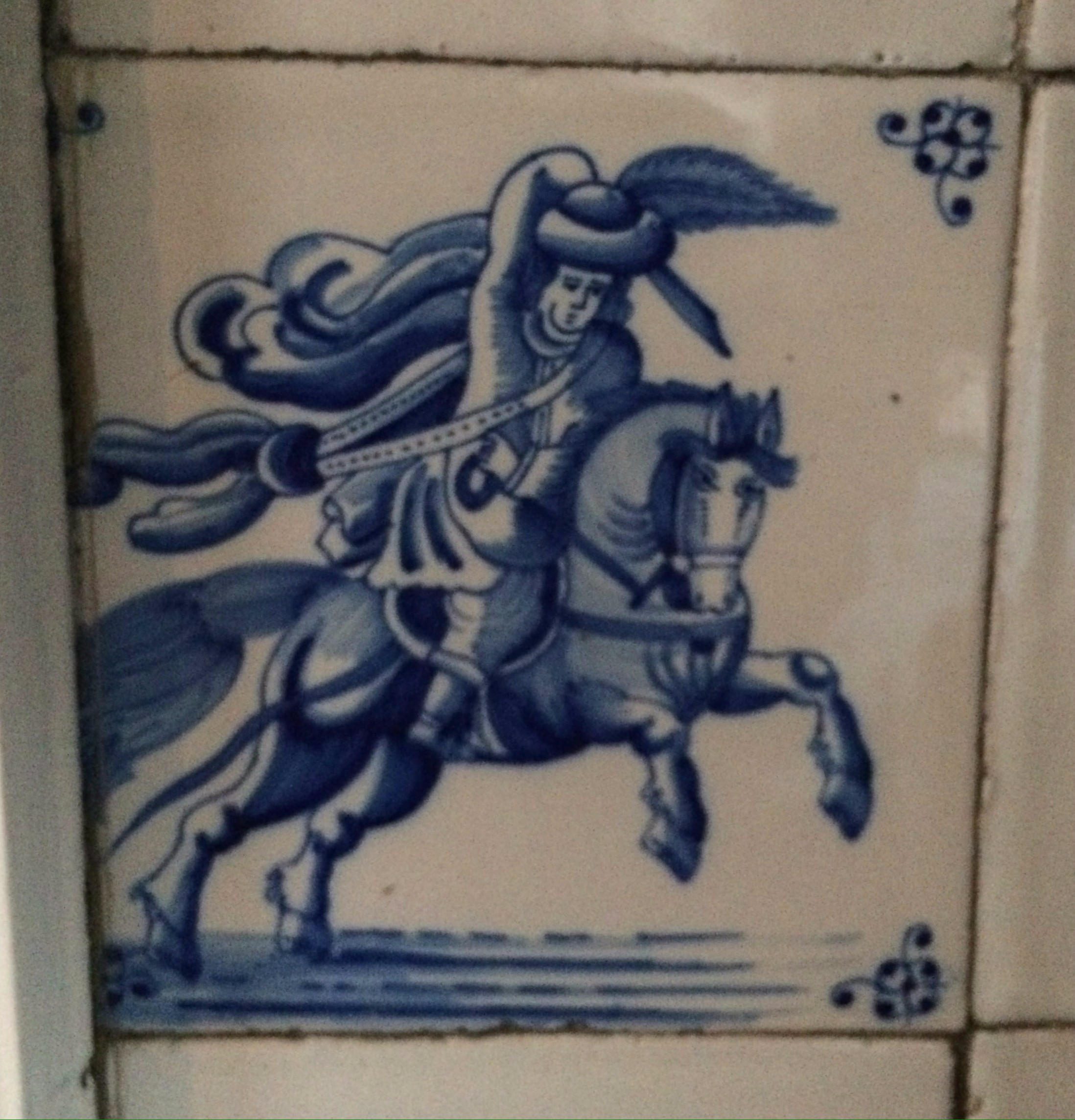
Braemar Castle, Horse & Rider tile by fireplace.

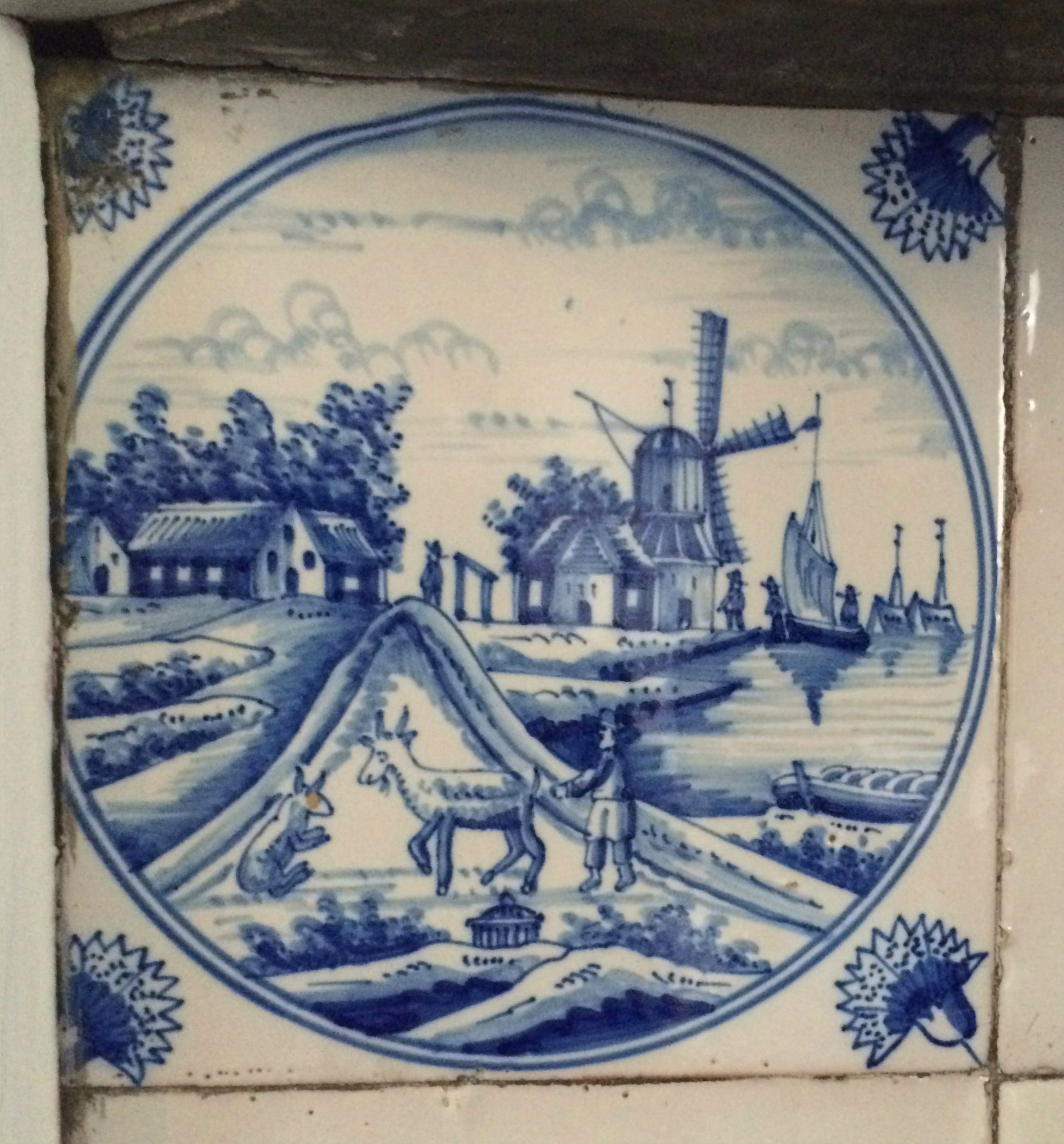
Braemar Castle, Windmill tile by fireplace.

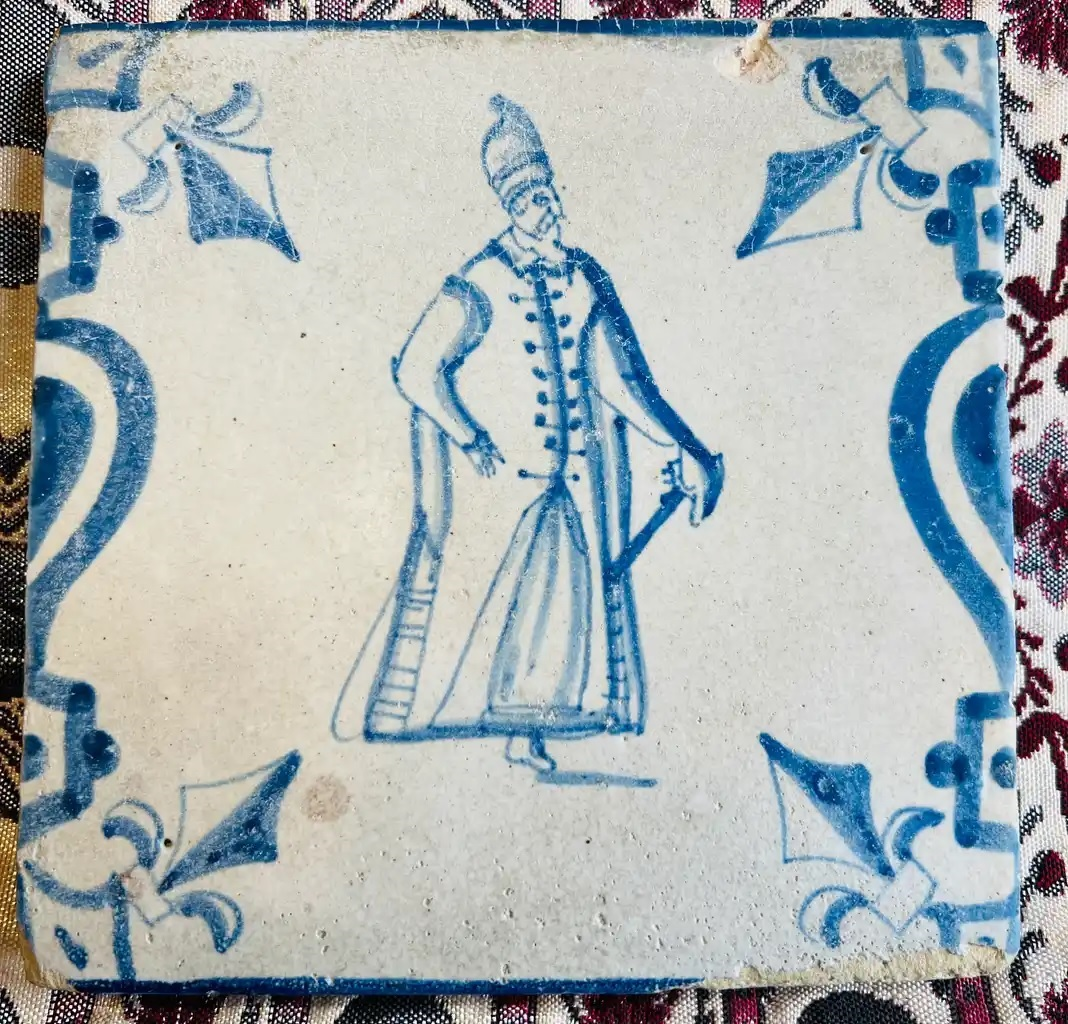
Dutch tile with an image of a Polish nobleman. Dated around 1640. Collection of the Krzywda-Kierzkowski family.

== See also ==
- Gallery Terra Delft, specialising in modern ceramic art
- KLM § Delft Blue houses
- Kraak ware
