= Tulip vase =

Type of Vase

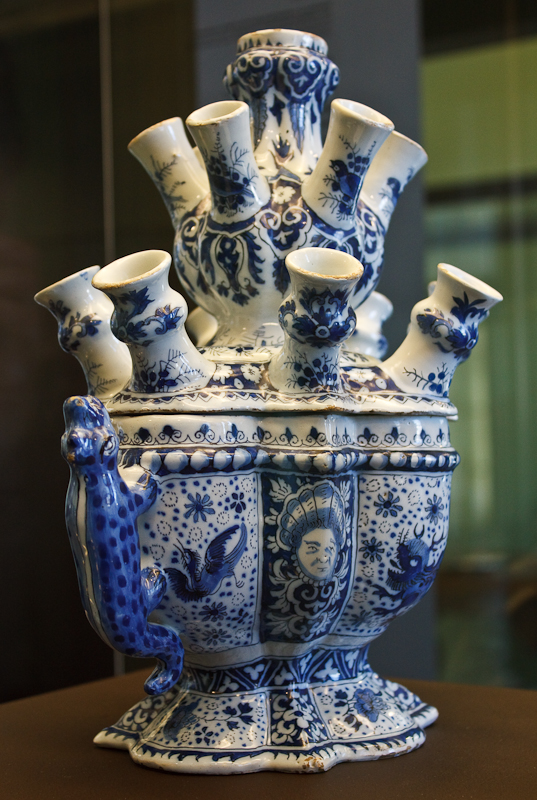
Delftware tulip vase, 18th century. Museum Boijmans van Beuningen, Rotterdam

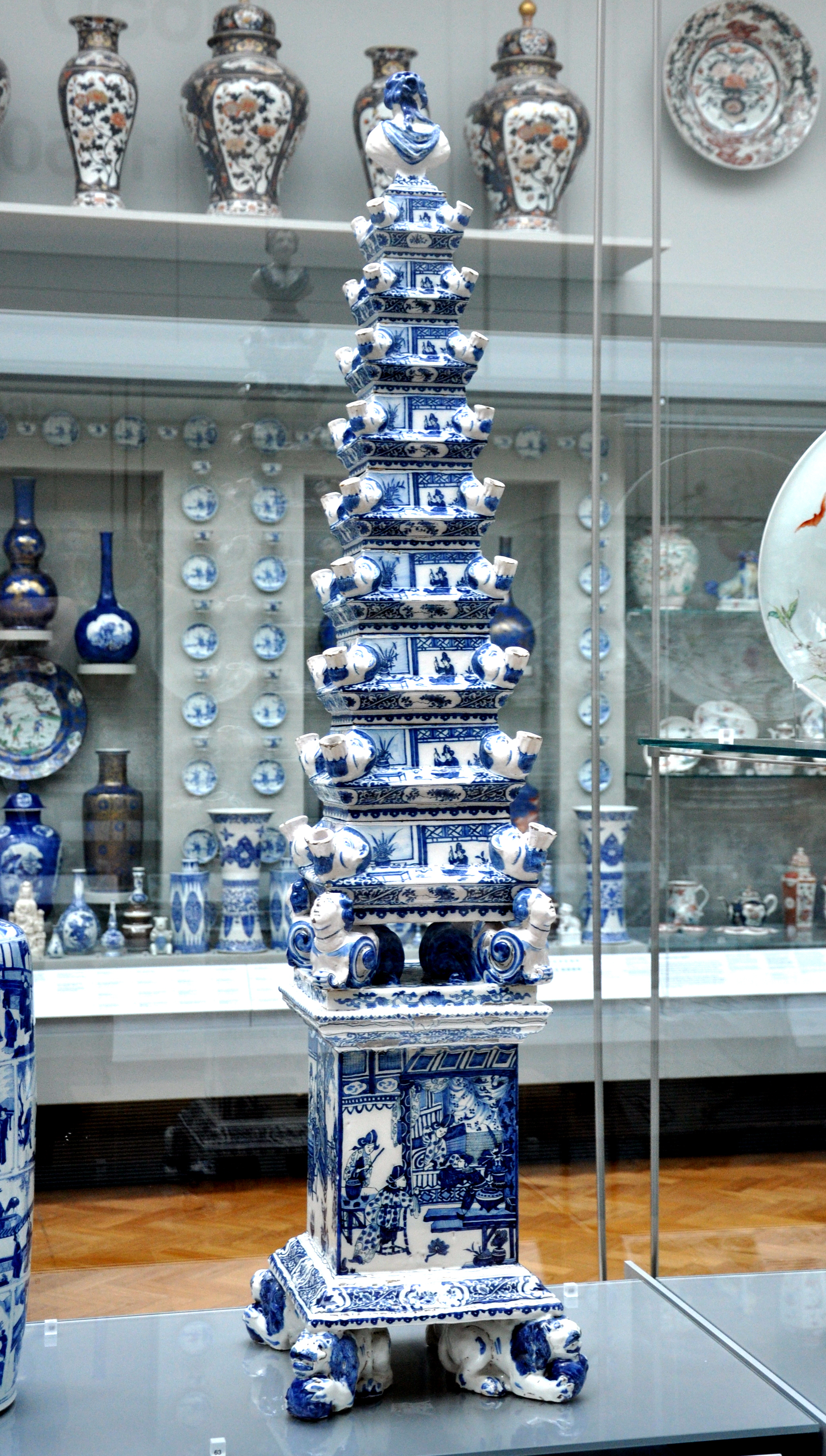
Delft Flower pyramid

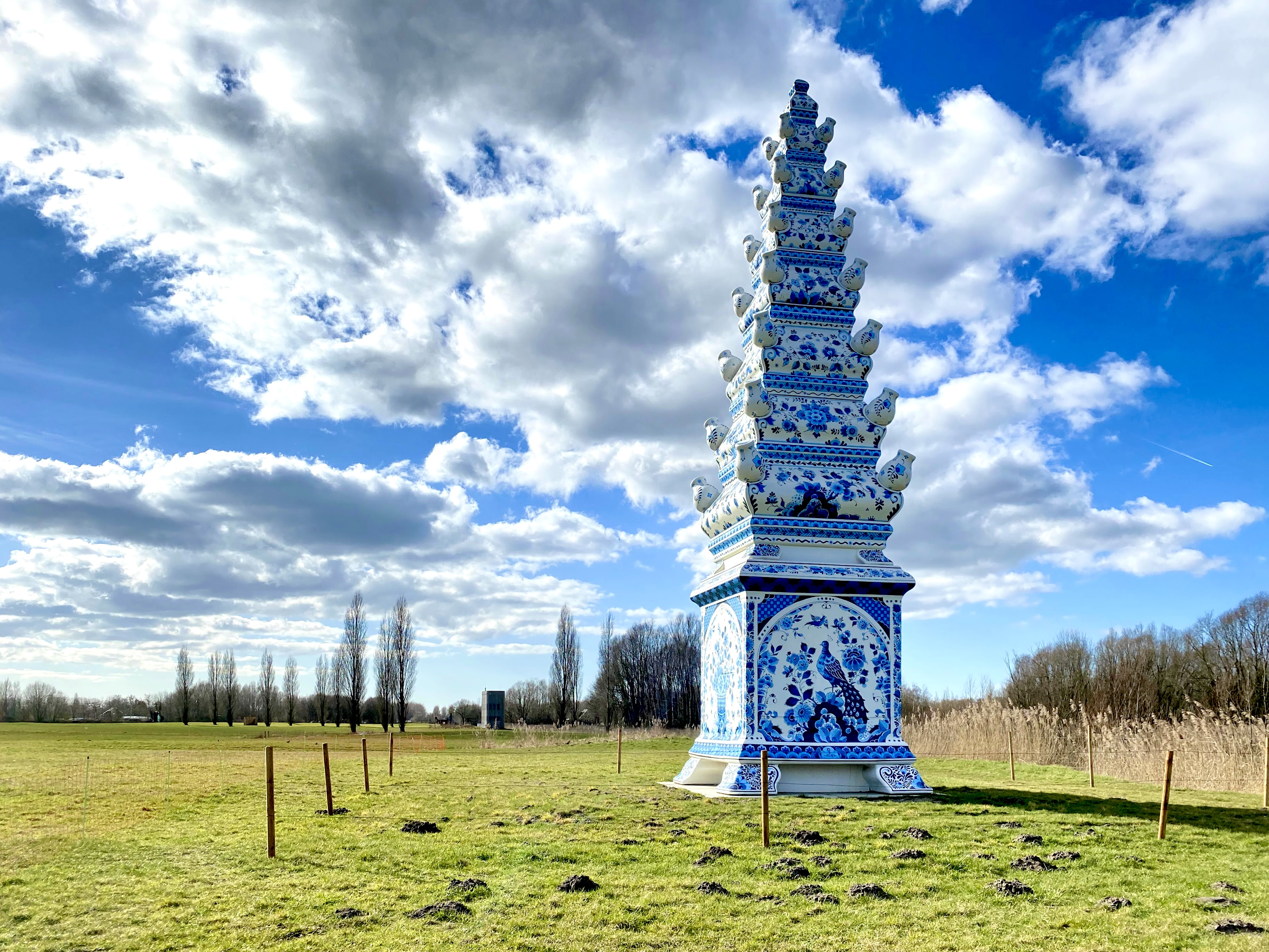
A 12-metre tall replica of the tulip vase pyramid in Delft

A tulip vase, or pyramid vase, is a vase designed to put cut flowers and especially tulips in, but it primarily serves as a decorative showpiece. They were first made in the Netherlands in the 17th century and were decorated with Delfts blauw or Chinese decoration. Replicas of the original tulip vases were made in China and were imported by the Dutch East India Company.

== History and origin ==
The tulip vase is a form of Delftware faience known for its specific blue colour which is used to decorate the earthenware. Delftware originated from the attempt to imitate Chinese porcelain; the Dutch potters tried to copy it, but they did not succeed.

The stackable tulip vases were made like that because the potters weren't able to make the vase out of one piece around 1700; it would collapse while firing it. Tulips were introduced in the Netherlands at the end of the 16th century; the bulbs came from Turkey and became a very expensive, fashionable flower. To this day tulips are very popular flowers.

Sometimes the pyramid vases, some perhaps inspired by the porcelain tower of Nanjing, were not used as flower vases at all, just as showpieces.

== Designs ==
Tulip vases can be round, square or oval and they are made in different sizes; the big ones have multiple floors and consist of loose stackable watertight elements and can be up to more than 1.5 metres high. At every level of the vase, one can insert flowers in the appropriate spouts around the vase. The big tulip vases were used to decorate the hearth during the summer and the smaller vases would be placed on the table on a festive occasion.

== See also ==
- Flower-holder
