= Willem Jansz Verstraeten =

Willem Verstraeten
- Born: c. 1590s Antwerp
- Died: 1655; Haarlem

Willem Jansz Verstraeten (c. 1590s – 1655) was a Dutch Golden Age tin-glazed maiolica maker in Haarlem.

Willem Verstraeten was the son of the Antwerp merchant Jean de la Rue, who left Antwerp probably soon after the Fall of Antwerp and moved to the Northern Netherlands, translating his French name to the Dutch "Jan Verstraeten". He moved to Haarlem in 1590. Willem was probably born shortly afterwards in Haarlem, and his father sent him to Delft 1613, where Willem worked at "De Porceleyne Schotel" factory. In 1617 Willem is documented there as a "contractant". In 1625 however he was back in Haarlem where he opened his own porcelain factory "Geleyer Plateelbackerije" in the Begijnhof where he made "Hollands Porceleyn". He must have been able to grow his business quickly, because in 1628 "Willem Jansz op het Begijnhof" was mentioned by Samuel Ampzing as a noted "plateel" manufacturer. The archives of Delft and Haarlem have documents that reflect various aspects of his life and that of his sons, most notably Gerrit who continued his business in Haarlem. Willem was a successful businessman and held leading positions in the Haarlem Guild of St. Luke from 1638. He died in Haarlem in 1655.

== Attribution of works ==
The difficulties surrounding the secure dating and attribution of Dutch pottery of the 17th century has to do with the differences in manufacturing process and purpose. Maiolica plates for daily use were much cheaper to produce and were generally of lower quality than those meant for special occasions. Most pottery makers in the Netherlands made both sorts, but did not leave distinguishing maker's marks on the bottom of them until the 18th century. This leaves the puzzle of attribution up to the various distinguishing traits of style. Since most 17th-century Dutch earthenware was meant to imitate Italian or Chinese imported models, it is difficult to trace the various types to specific factories. For centuries it was assumed that all pottery (besides tiles) in the Netherlands in the 16th and 17th centuries was imported from France, Italy or China or came from a few manufacturing centers in Antwerp. Certainly Antwerp had many manufacturers of tin-glazed ware in the 16th century.

Early in the 20th century it was already concluded that Rotterdam, Delft, Haarlem and Amsterdam were also production centers. Recent 20th-century research into archeological finds in the Netherlands show how difficult it is to prove the precise origin of pottery shards though their factories are securely documented through archival documentation. Most ovens for bread or pottery baking were situated outside city limits as a fire hazard, and when large quantities of waste material was created through process-related problems, these were generally disposed of elsewhere, being used as landfill for repairing dikes, for example. Based on analysis of the types of earthenware found in various old dike repair locations, certain conclusions can be drawn localizing the origin of the pieces based on quantity and today certain "arabesque" decorations are attributed to Willem Jansz. Verstraeten and refer both to him specifically and/or his son Gerrit. He probably also had a son or other relative in Delft however, and though no genealogical research has proven it, he was probably related to other Verstraetens in the Haarlem area registered in the Haarlem Guild of St. Luke as porcelain sellers or painters.

== Daily use pottery with double "aigrette" rim ==
The Verstraeten factory is known for its characteristic double "aigrette" rim.

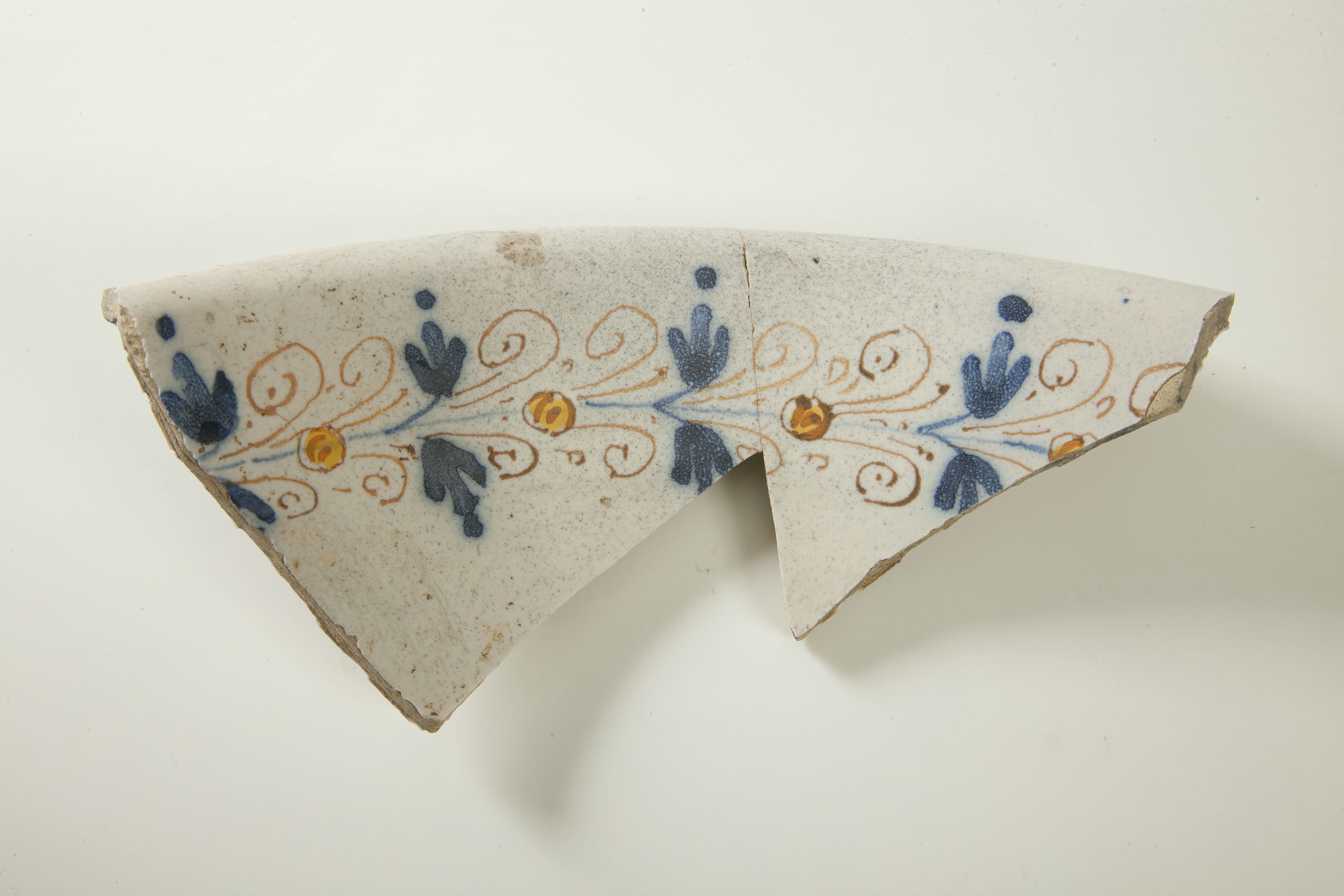
Haarlem shard of a double aigrette rim (found in the IJsselmeer)

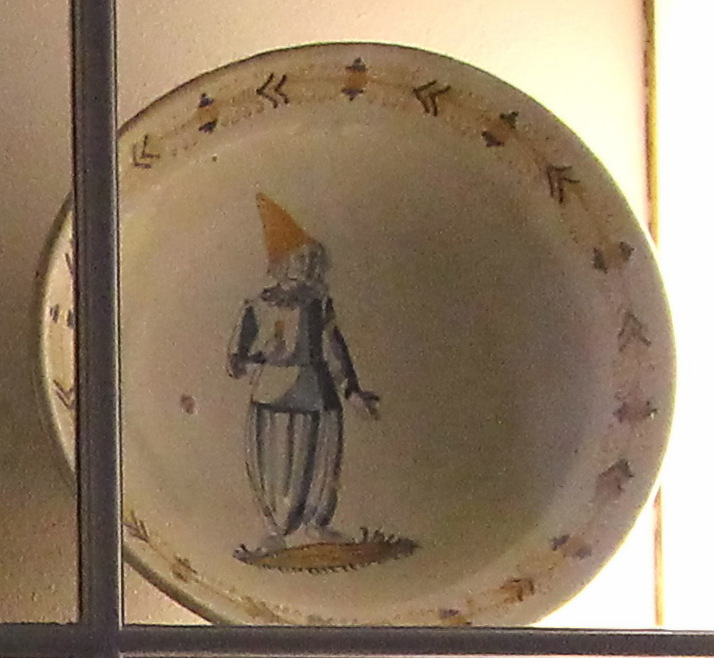
Bowl with double aigrette rim attributed to Willem Jansz Verstraeten, Frans Hals Museum

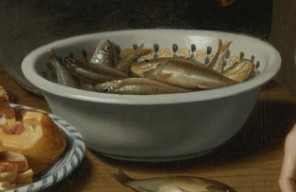
Fish bowl with double aigrette rim in a painting by Floris van Schooten, a colleague of Willem Jansz Verstraeten in the Haarlem Guild of St. Luke

== Fine pottery in the "grotesque" style ==
For a long time the "grotesque" or "arabesque" faience now attributed to Willem Jansz Verstraeten was assumed to have come from the factories in Italy copying works from Urbino. It was the German art historian Otto Riesebieter who first attributed a group of these copies to the Northern Netherlands and noticed close connections between these copies and other earthenware decorated with a double "aigrette" rim.

Italian examples:

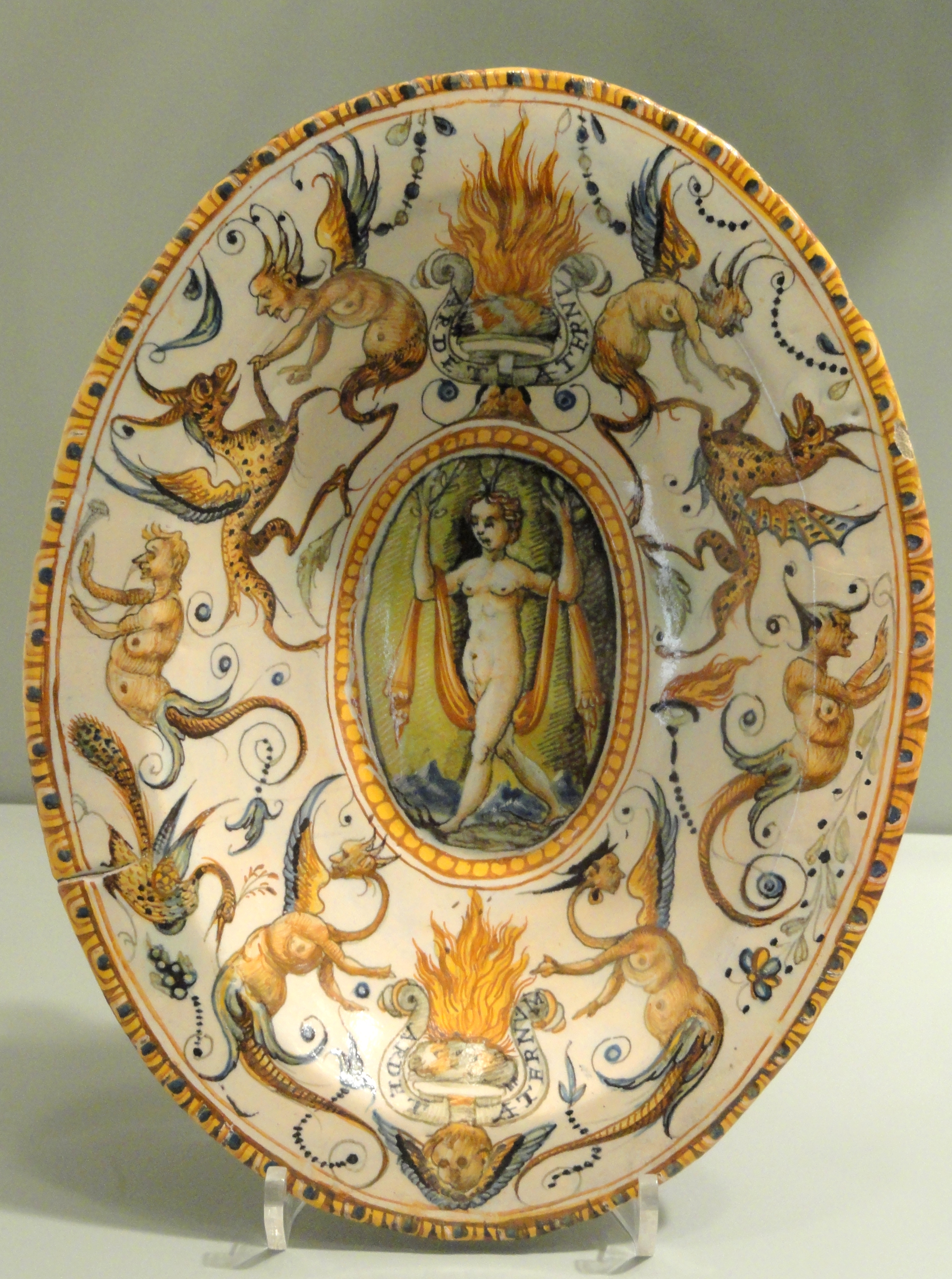
Dish from the service of Alfonso II d'Este, Duke of Ferrara, 1579 or later, Urbino, probably from the Patanazzi workshop, Gardiner Museum, Toronto

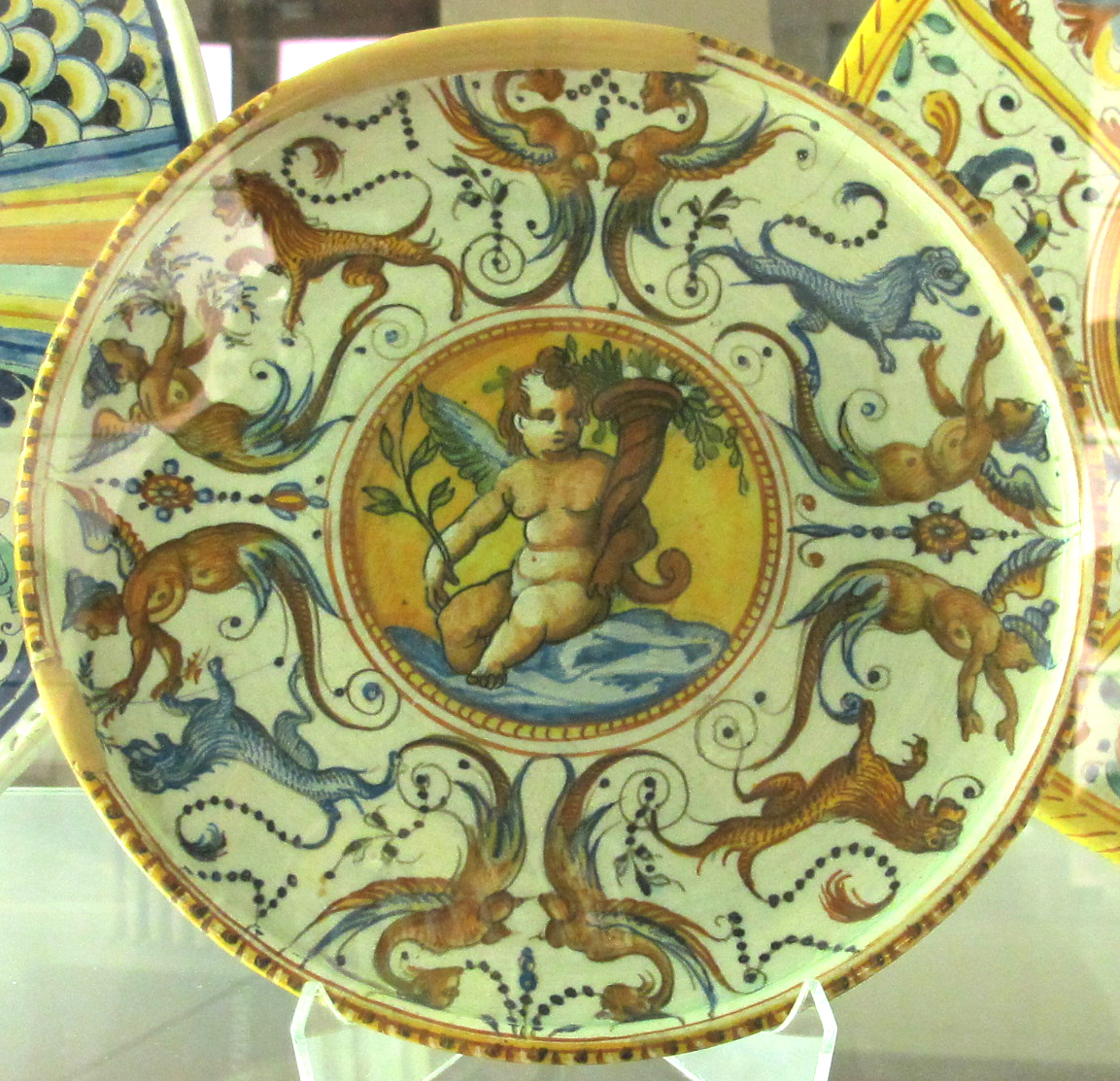
Deruta maiolica plate, 17th-century, Arezzo museum

Examples by Verstraeten:

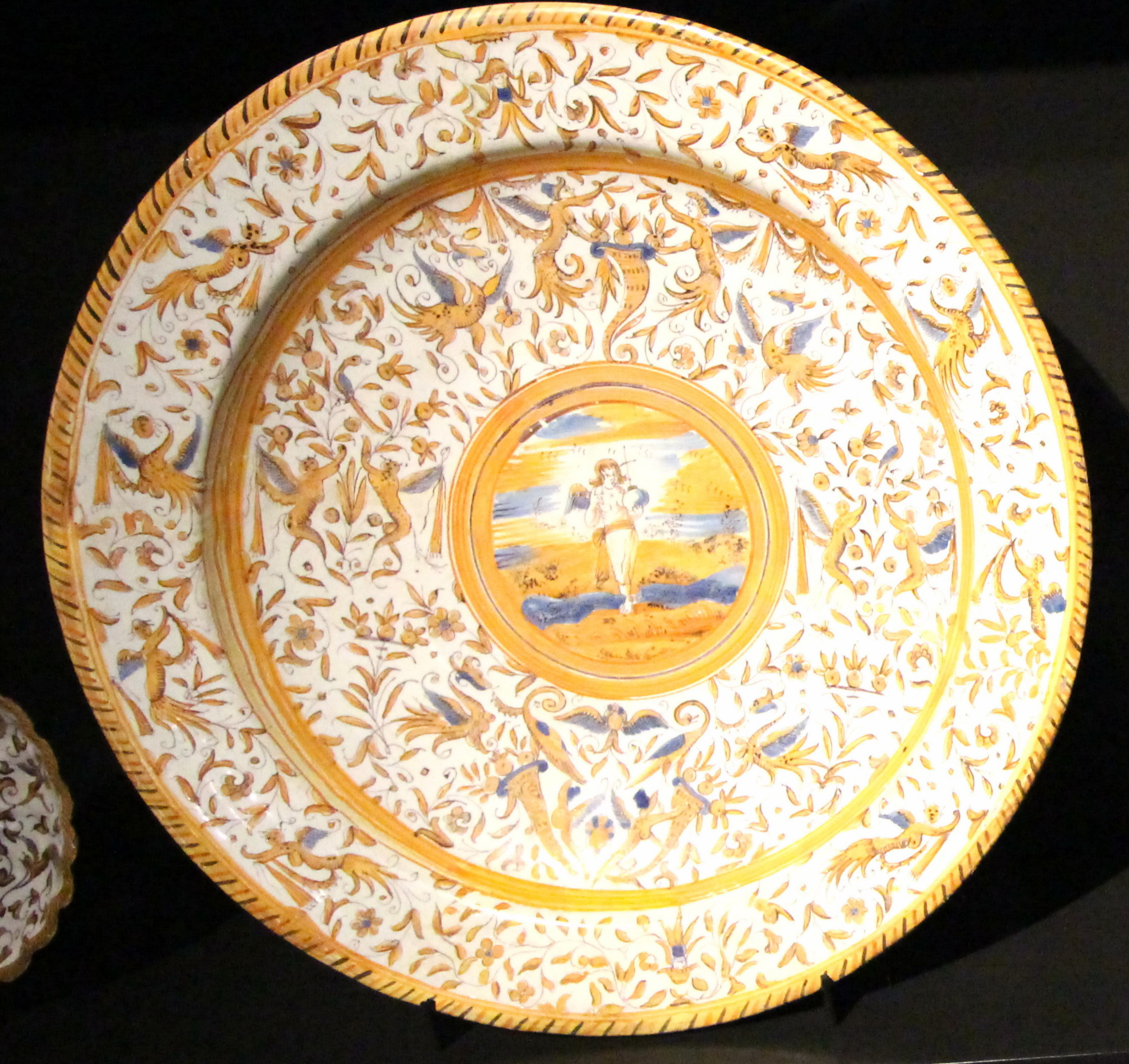
"Dish with an Angel" attributed to Willem Jansz. Verstraeten with arabesques on the rim reminiscent of the Urbino style tin-glazed ware, Rijksmuseum

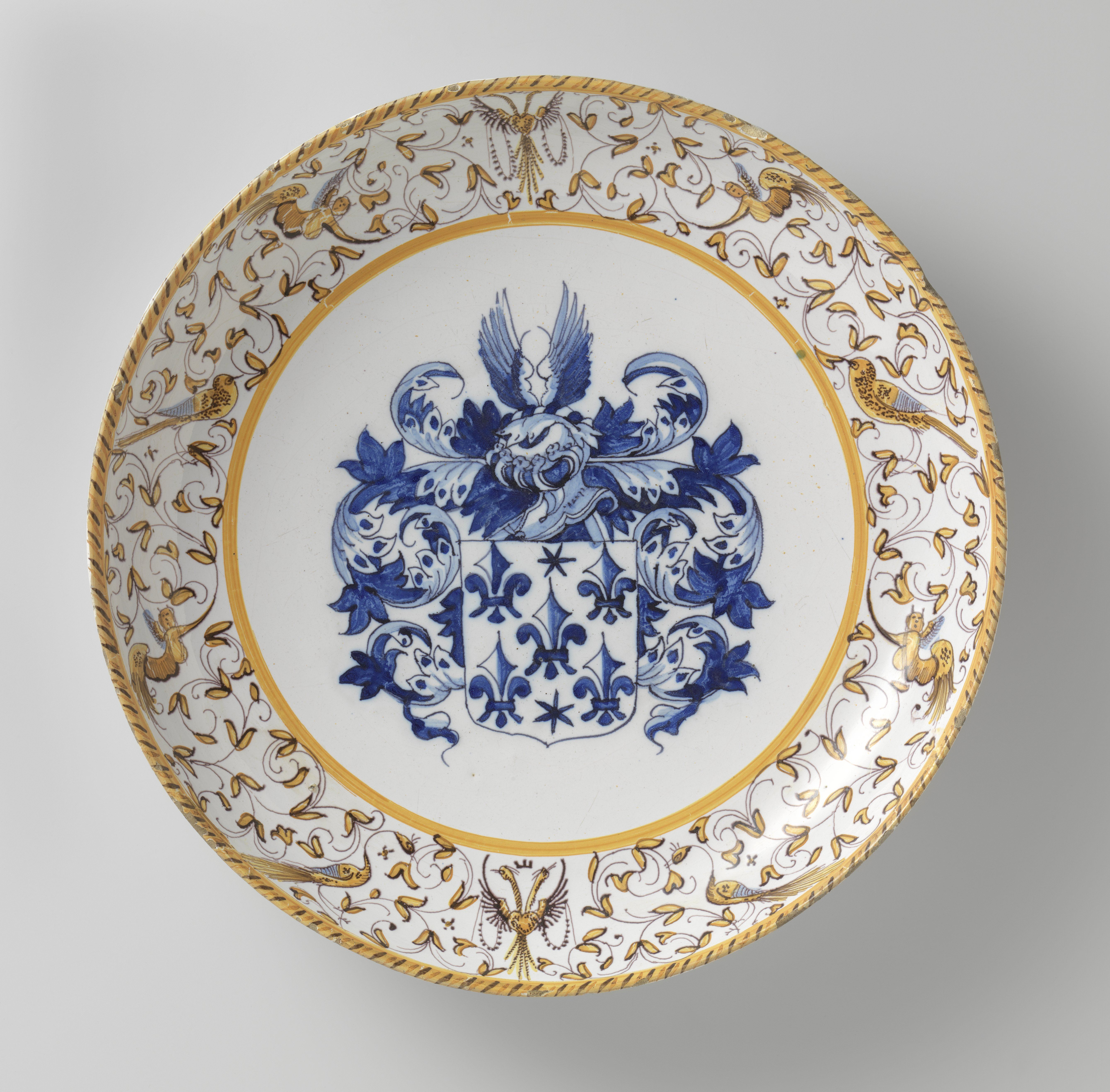
"Armorial Dish" (wapenbord) attributed to Willem Jansz. Verstraeten with arabesques on the rim reminiscent of the Urbino style tin-glazed ware, Rijksmuseum
