= English delftware =

Tin-glazed pottery

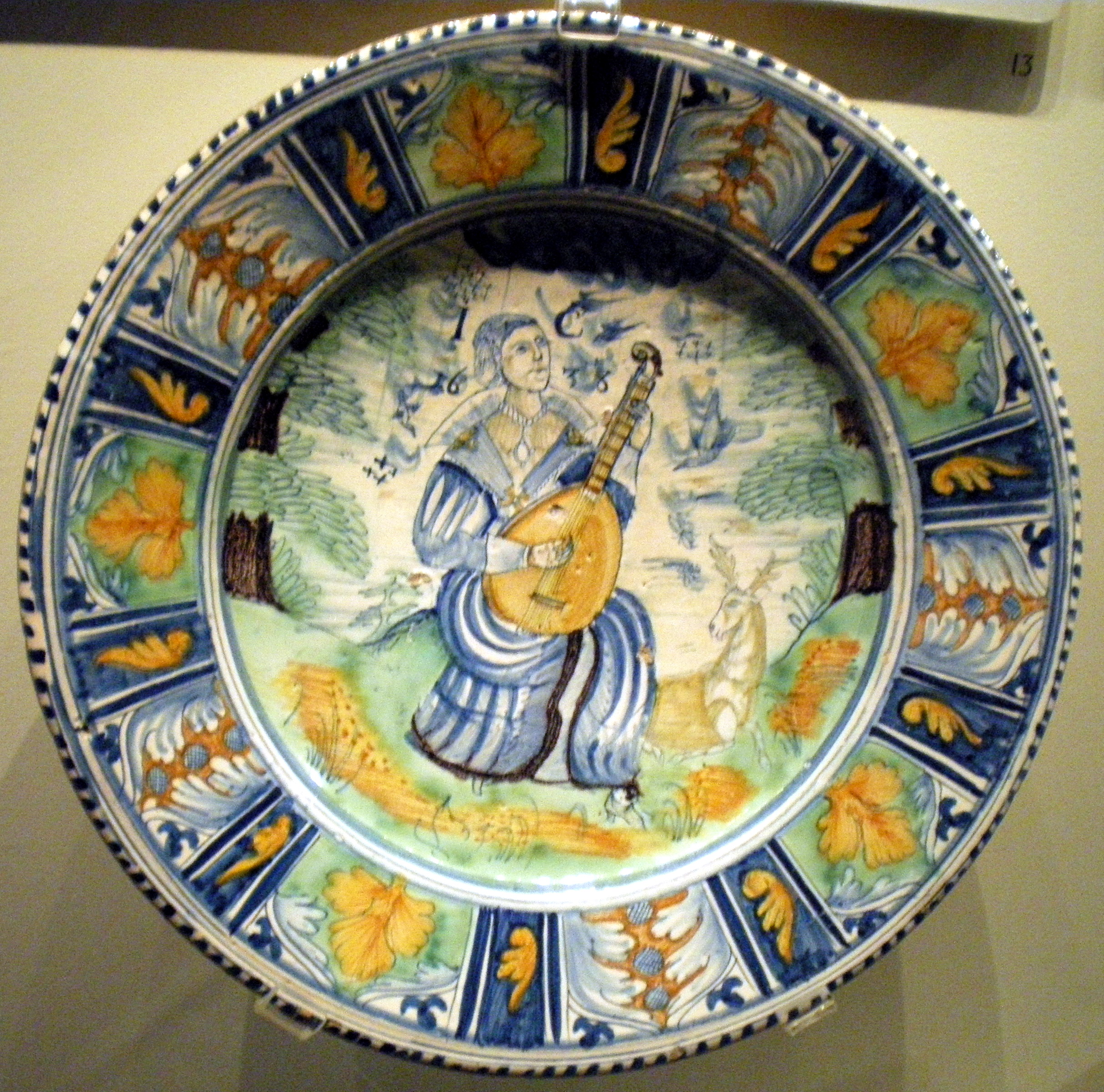
English delftware dish, 1638, probably by Richard Irons, Southwark, London (Victoria and Albert Museum)

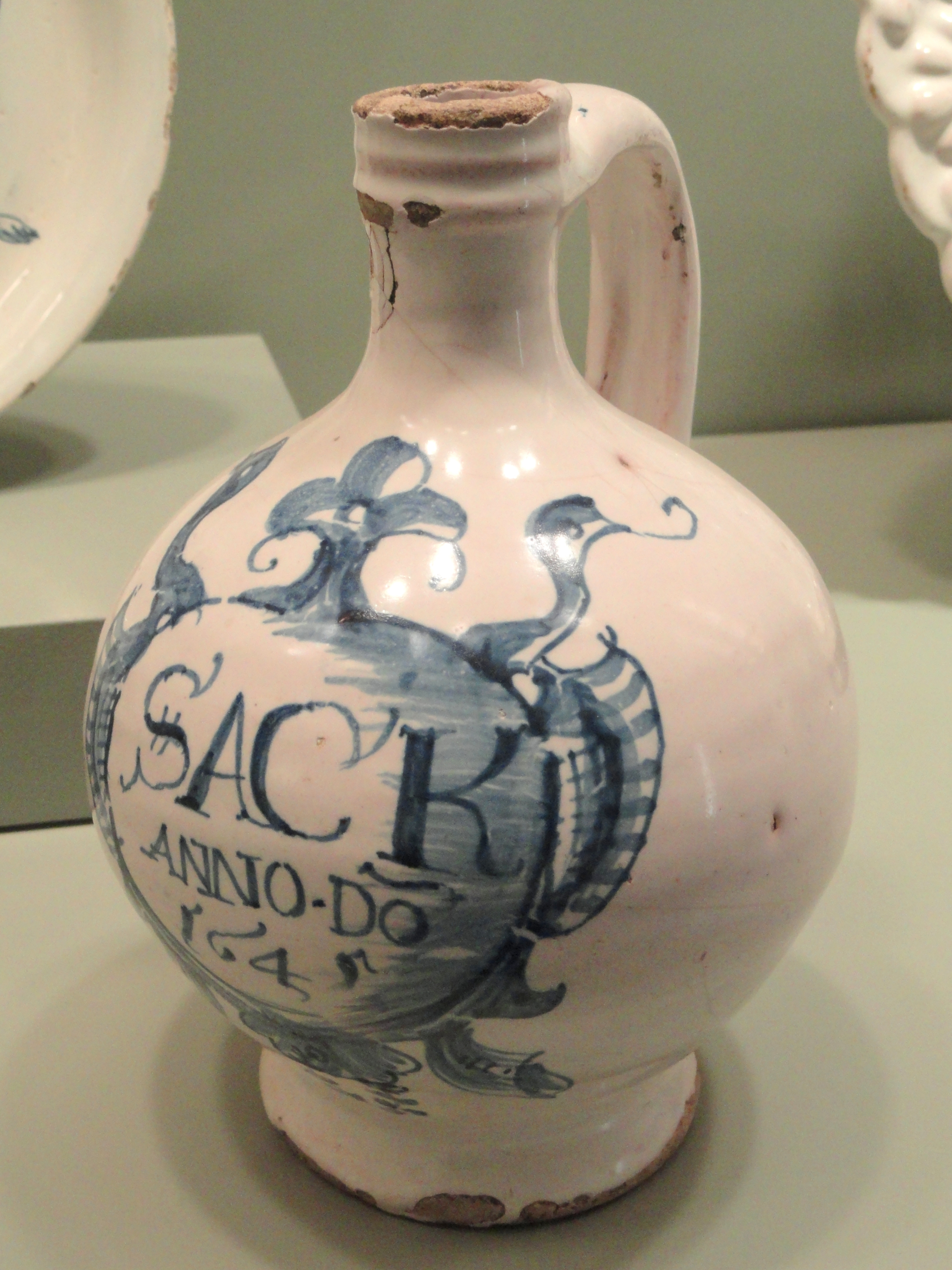
Wine Bottle, dated 1645, London

English delftware is tin-glazed pottery made in Britain and Ireland between about 1550 and the late 18th century. The main centres of production were London, Bristol and Liverpool with smaller centres at Lancaster, Wincanton, Glasgow and Dublin. English tin-glazed pottery was called "galleyware" or "galliware" and its makers "gallypotters" until the early 18th century; it was given the name delftware after the tin-glazed pottery from the Netherlands.

Many everyday wares were made: tiles, mugs, drug jars, dishes, wine bottles, posset pots, salt pots, candlesticks, fuddling cups (that is, ale mugs joined in groups of three, four or five with connecting holes to confuse the drinker), puzzle jugs (similar to fuddling cups), barber's bowls, pill slabs, bleeding bowls, porringers and flower bricks. Humble undecorated items included chamberpots, colanders and small disposable ointment pots (gallipots), dispensed by apothecaries. Large decorative dishes, often called chargers, were popular, and included much of the most ambitious painting, often stretching the artists to the edge of their capabilities, and beyond.

== The nature of English delftware ==
English delftware pottery and its painted decoration is similar in many respects to that from Holland, but its peculiarly English quality has been commented upon: "... there is a relaxed tone and a sprightliness which is preserved throughout the history of English delftware; the overriding mood is provincial and naïve rather than urbane and sophisticated." Caiger-Smith describes its mood as "ingenuous, direct, sometimes eccentric"; and Garner talks of its "quite distinctive character". Its methods and techniques were simpler than those of its continental counterparts. English tin-glaze potters rarely used the transparent overglaze applied by the more sophisticated Dutch and Italian potters. The enamels so popular on the continent in the 18th century were used only for a short time at Liverpool, where the so-called Fazackerly wares were made.

== Early wares ==
An English delftware jug has been found in East Malling, Kent, with a silver mount hallmarked 1550, which is presumed to be the earliest date of manufacture. (Malling jugs may be seen in the Museum of London and the Victoria and Albert Museum.)

John Stow's Survey of London (1598) records the arrival in 1567 of two Antwerp potters, Jasper Andries and Jacob Jansen, in Norwich, where they made "Gally Paving Tiles, and vessels for Apothecaries and others, very artificially". In 1570 Jansen applied to Queen Elizabeth I for the sole right to practice "galleypotting" in London and soon set up a workshop at Aldgate to the east of the city. There were already other Flemish potters in London, two of them in Southwark recorded in 1571 as "painters of pottes".

The earliest known piece with an English inscription is a dish dated 1600 in the Museum of London. It is painted in blue, purple, green, orange and yellow and depicts the Tower of London and Old London Bridge, surrounded by the words, "THE ROSE IS RED THE LEAVES ARE GRENE GOD SAVE ELIZABETH OUR QUEENE" and an Italianate border of masks and leaves. The rim is decorated with dashes of blue and can be considered the first in series of large decorated dishes so painted and called blue-dash chargers.

== Blue-dash chargers ==
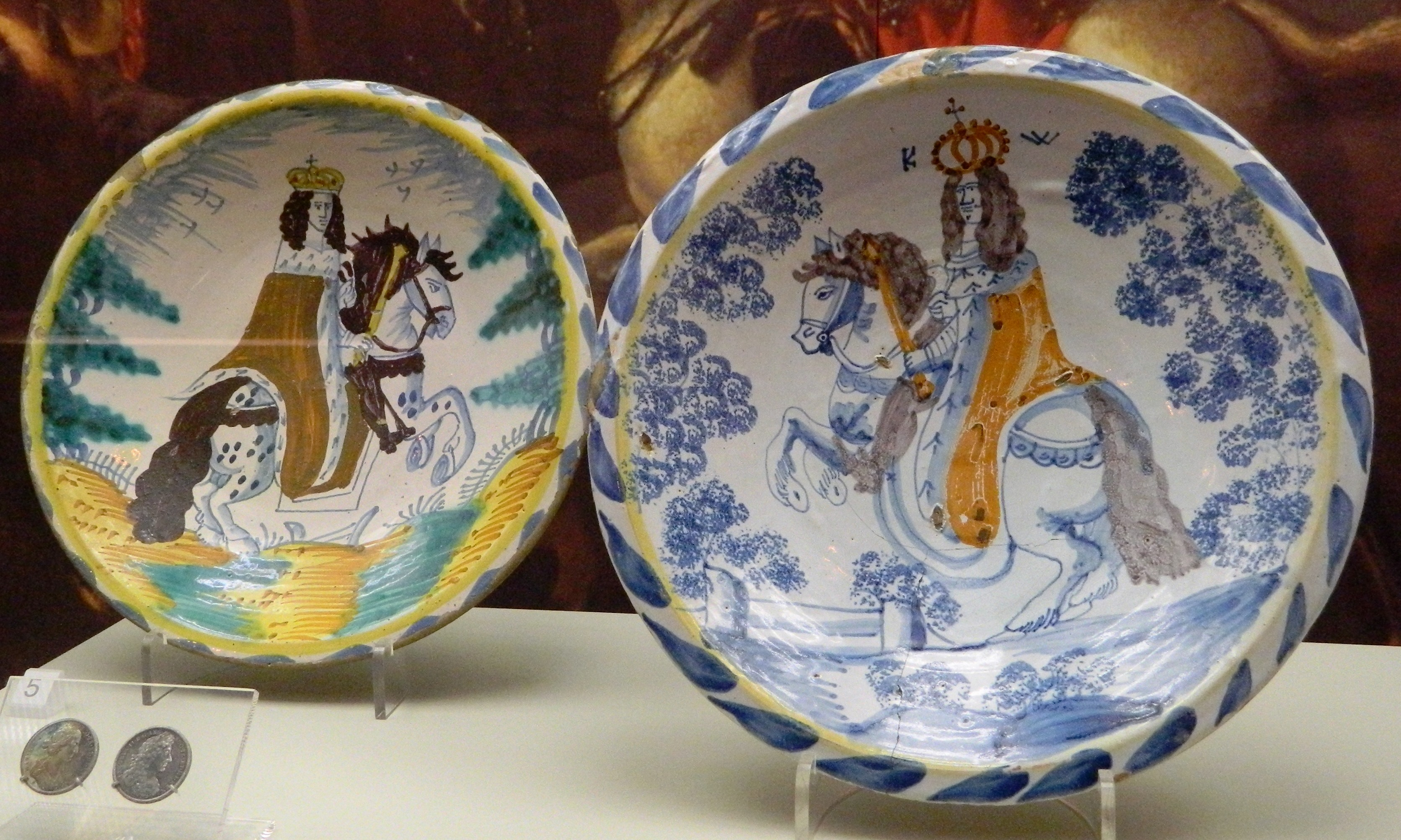
Two chargers with William III of England

Blue-dash chargers, usually between about 25 and 35 cm in diameter with abstract, floral, religious, patriotic or topographical motifs, were produced in quantity by London and Bristol potters until the early 18th century. As they were kept for decoration on walls, dressers and side-tables, many have survived and they are well represented in museum collections. Their name comes from the slanting blue dashes round the rim, seen in both examples at the left.

One of the most popular decorations on the blue-dash charger was a representation of Adam and Eve with the serpent in the Garden of Eden, produced from the 1630s to the 1730s. "The challenge of rendering the anatomy of Adam and Eve was inescapable, and as the subject became more and more freely repeated by painters of less and less competence, most of the anatomy gave trouble, particularly Adam's abdominal muscles, which eventually became grotesque and could not be wholly covered by his fig-leaf." In later examples, "the images had declined to the level of coloured graffiti; Adam and Eve were cave dwellers, the Tree had become a mere cipher and only the serpent and the fruit proved simple enough to survive debasement."

== Later wares ==
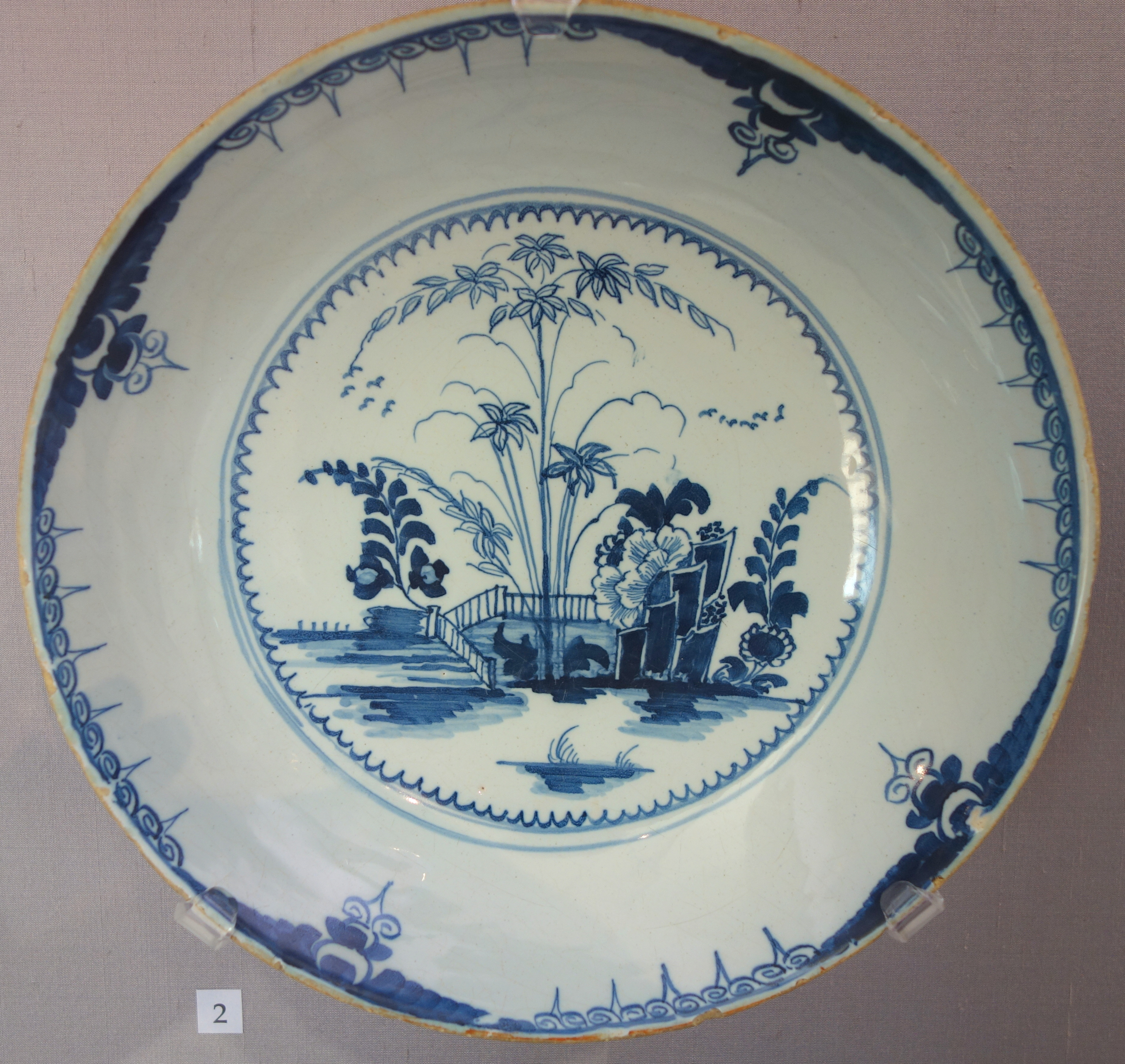
Chinoiserie bowl, Lambeth Pottery, c. 1760

Towards the end of the 17th changing taste led to the replacement of apothecary pots, tiles and large dishes by polite tablewares, delicate ornaments, punch bowls, teapots, cocoa pots and coffee-pots. The decoration became lighter and more informal. Changing taste was also reflected in chinoiserie decoration and greater use of a polychrome palette.

In Bristol and Lambeth from the mid-18th century there was much use of a technique imported from Italy, bianco sopra bianco (white-on-white). The object was covered in a tin-glaze tinted with a small amount of colouring oxide, with decoration over it in white tin-glaze.

The development of creamware, a very white and tough earthenware, by Wedgwood and other North Staffordshire potters spelled the end of English delftware. Decoration could be applied to the bisque ware from printed transfers, white pottery could be produced with a clear lead-glaze, and the result was pottery lighter and more durable than tin-glazed ware. The north Staffordshire potteries also introduced new wares and industrial techniques that disadvantaged the delftware makers, and by the 19th century tin-glazed earthenware almost died out until its revival in the form of art pottery a hundred years later.

== Collections ==
There are good examples of English delftware in the Victoria and Albert Museum, the British Museum, the Ashmolean Museum and the Fitzwilliam Museum.
