= Tulipiere =

Vase for tulips

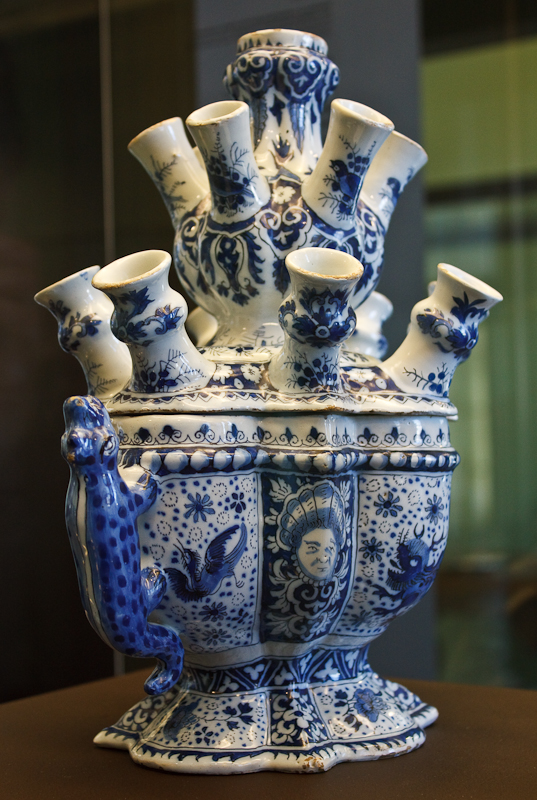
Delftware tulipiere, 18th century

A tulipiere or tulip-holder is an ornate vessel in which to grow tulips and is usually made of hand-crafted pottery, classically delftware. They are typically constructed to accommodate one bulb per spout with a larger common water reservoir base. They were not designed as vases for a cut bloom, as is sometimes supposed, though they could also be used for this. The boughpot and flower brick were types of vases for this.

== History ==
While fairly uncommon in modernity, during the 17th century tulipieres were used to grow tulip bulbs indoors and were common pieces of decorative art that could often be found in the houses of European elites. After the advent of large-scale global trade in the 17th century, numerous flower bulbs from Asia such as the tulip, crocus, and hyacinth became luxury items in Europe and these bulbs remained an exotic novelty until the end of the 17th century. Large floor-standing pyramid-shaped tulipieres were particularly ornate and were used as a status symbol to indicate the owner's wealth.
