= Bough pot =

Ceramic pot used to display flowers and branches

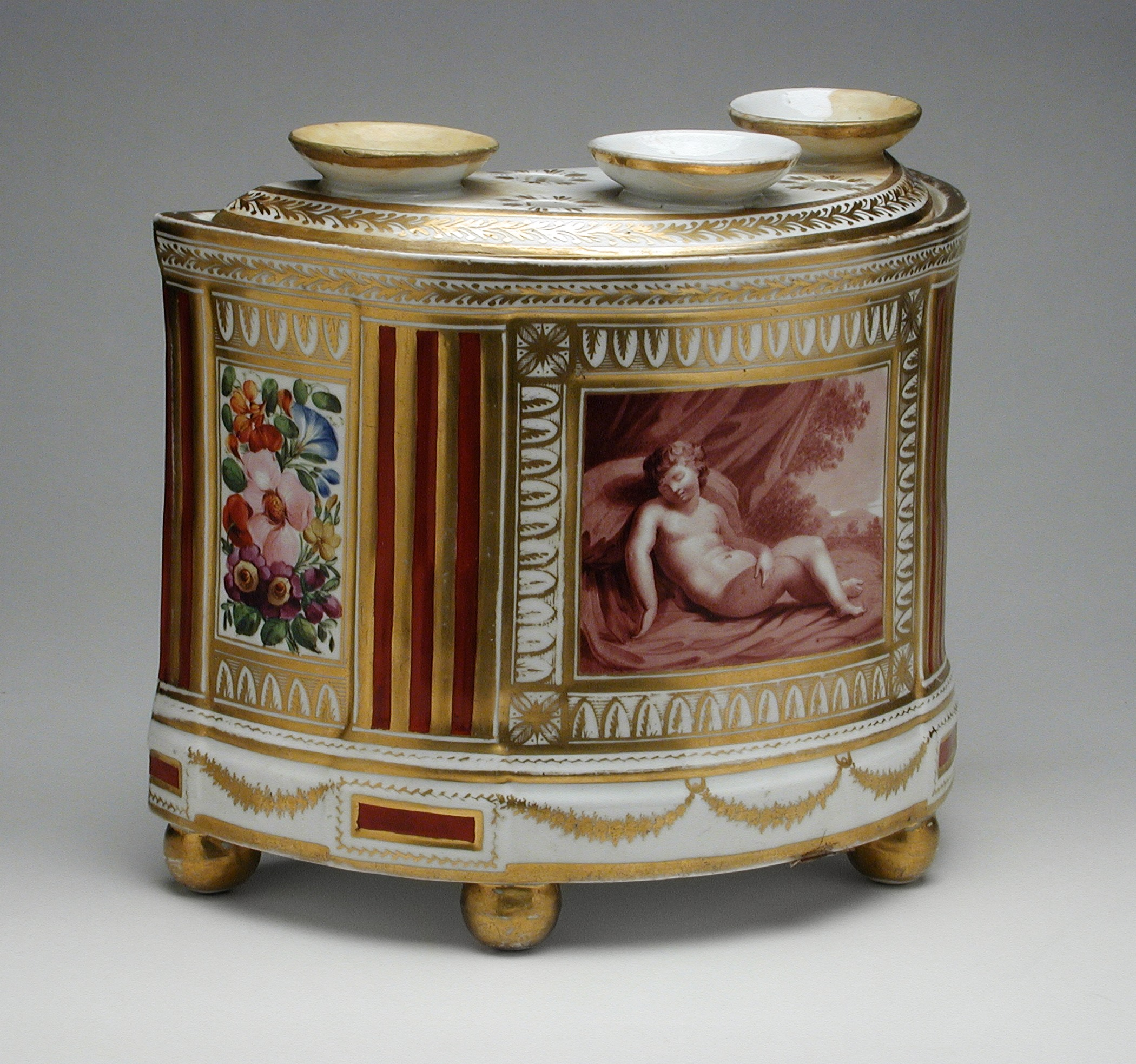
A Bough pot, height with cover- 6 5/8 in. (16.83 cm)

A bough pot is a vessel for holding stems of flowers and branches to decorate an interior, especially a fireplace during summer. They are typically ceramic, and have a body to hold water, with a number of small openings for the stems in the top. Often the top lifts off. The tulipiere and flower brick are types that allow larger numbers of flowers.

The term "bough pot" was common in use in Europe during the 18th and 19th centuries.

== History ==
During summer in Europe, the fireplace was not used in a house. Instead, they were decorated with floral arrangements. These arrangements consisted of vessels and pots, The term "bough pot" was a colloquial term and came to mean the pots that were used for decorating the fireplace.
