= Rye Pottery =

Coordinates: 50.9499°N 0.7304°E

The Rye Pottery is a pottery in Rye, East Sussex, England, known as the Cadborough Pottery or "Rye Pottery" from its beginnings in c. 1834 to 1876, and Belle Vue Pottery from 1869 until it closed in 1939 (for a few years two locations were used). It was revived as the "Rye pottery" in 1947 by the brothers Walter and John Cole, who became known for their tinglazed wares. During the 19th and early 20th centuries it produced earthenware in a distinctive style of sprigged applied relief decoration, sometimes supplemented by inscriptions using printer's type, which was marketed as "Sussex Rustic Ware". Often the texture of surfaces imitated tree bark. From c. 1840 to 1930 it was owned by members of the Mitchell family.

== History ==
The Rye pottery has its origins in a pottery and brickworks at Cadborough Farm, just to the west of the town of Rye. In the early 19th century, Jeremiah Smith, the owner of the farm, put William Mitchell in charge of the pottery. The clay used was dug in the farm itself.

Mitchell was in charge of the pottery by 1834, and had bought the business from Smith by 1840. He was assisted by his two sons, Henry and Frederick. Frederick, along with another potter called William Watson, developed a style of applied relief decoration, which was to become characteristic of the firm's production. In 1869, Frederick Mitchell moved production of the decorative ware to new premises in Ferry Road Rye, called the Belle Vue pottery, while more functional products continued to be made at Cadborough, by William Mitchell, and after his death in 1870 by Frederick's brother Henry.

The products of the Belle Vue Pottery were sold under the name the trade name of Sussex Rustic Ware. Llewellynn Jewitt, in his Ceramic Art of Great Britain described this ware as "of peculiar, but highly pleasing character", and said that "The clay is peculiarly light, and of tolerably close texture, and it is capable of working into any form. The glaze ... is of exceedingly good quality, and it has a rich effect over the mottling or splashing which characterizes this ware." The relief decoration on the ware represented hops - an important local crop - or leaves and flowers. Another product, which was also made at Cadborough Pottery, was the "Sussex Pig", a vessel of porcine form, with the detachable head serving as a cup.

After Frederick's death in 1875, the business was carried on by his widow Caroline, assisted by William Watson. When Caroline Mitchell died in 1896, the pottery was taken over by her husband's nephew, also called Frederick. It was inherited by his wife, Edith in 1920, and sold to Ella Mills in 1930. The products remained little changed until the closure of the pottery with the outbreak of war in 1939.

In 1947 the Belle Vue Pottery was bought and reopened by the brothers Walter Cole (1913–1999) and John Cole. Immediately before this, Walter Cole had been on the staff of the Council for Industrial Design, and had also taught on the Central School's Industrial Design course. In the 1930s the brothers had produced both stoneware and earthenware at a kiln they had built at Plumstead.

At Rye, the Cole brothers decided to make earthenware, which gave the possibility of brighter look and a wider range of colours than the stoneware popular with most craft potters at the time. They produced both one-off exhibition pieces, and more practical domestic ware. At first, the revived pottery made slipware, but as government regulations on the production of decorative ceramics for the home market were relaxed, the pottery began to make a distinctive range of tin-glazed ware, inspired by 17th century examples. It also made versions of the traditional "Sussex Pig" A selection of the pottery's products was shown at the Festival of Britain in 1951.

Walter Cole's son Tarquin & his wife Biddy took over the running of the pottery in 1978. Under his direction it began to make a wide range of hand-painted slip-cast figures, including a series based on characters from the Canterbury Tales.

Rye Pottery is now run by the third generation of the Cole family, siblings Josh & Tabby. The company currently produces mid-century modern homewares inspired by its extensive 50s & 60s archive, alongside slip cast figures dedicated to English history, including a 1066 Bayeux Tapestry range as well as animals and birds from the English countryside. Recent high profile collaborations include Soho House’s White City House hotel, Turner Contemporary in Margate and boutique hotel The George in Rye.
