= Vase =

Open container, often used to hold cut flowers

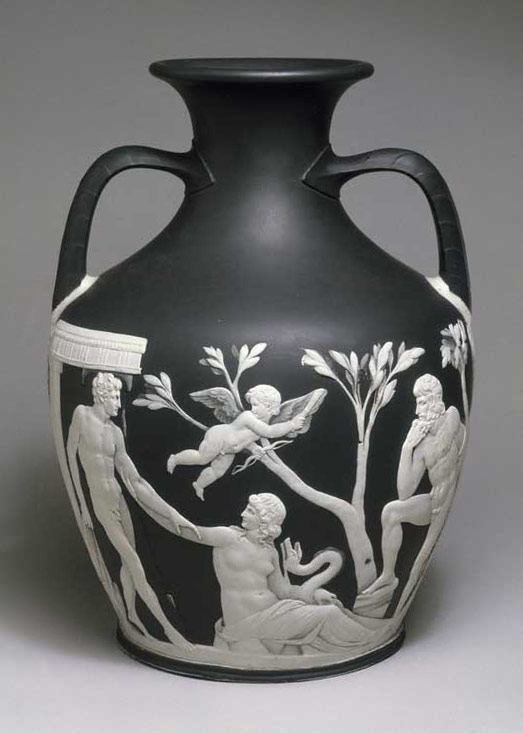
Neoclassical vase; circa 1790; jasper; height: 25.4 cm, width: 18.7 cm; Victoria and Albert Museum (London)

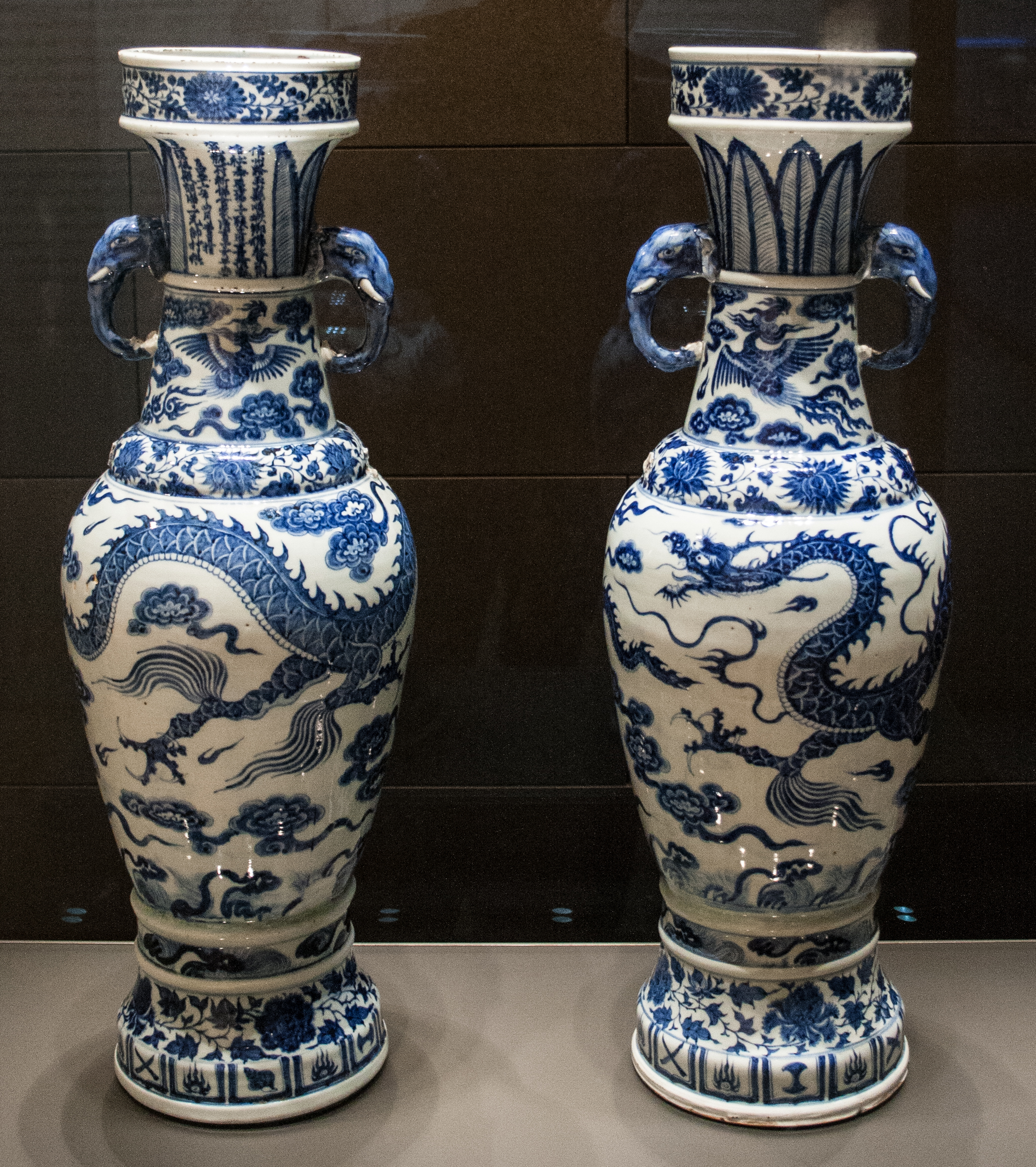
The David Vases; 1351 (the Yuan Dynasty); porcelain, cobalt blue decor under glaze; height: 63.8 cm; British Museum (London)

A vase (/veɪs/, /veɪz/, or /vɑːz/) is an open container. It can be made from a number of materials, such as ceramics, glass, or non-rusting metals, such as aluminium, brass, bronze, or stainless steel. Even wood has been used to make vases, either by using tree species that naturally resist rot, such as teak, or by applying a protective coating to conventional wood or plastic. Vases are often decorated, and they are often used to hold cut flowers. Vases come in different sizes to support whatever flower is being held or kept in place.

Vases generally share a similar shape. The foot or the base may be bulbous, flat, carinate, or another shape. The body forms the main portion of the piece. Some vases have a shoulder, where the body curves inward, a neck, which gives height, and a lip, where the vase flares back out at the top. Some vases are also given handles.

Various styles and types of vases have been developed around the world in different time periods, such as Chinese ceramics and Native American pottery. In the pottery of ancient Greece "vase-painting" is the traditional term covering the famous fine painted pottery, often with many figures in scenes from Greek mythology. Such pieces may be referred to as vases regardless of their shape; most were in fact used for holding or serving liquids, and many would more naturally be called cups, jugs and so on. In 2003, Grayson Perry won the Turner Prize for his ceramics, typically in vase form.

== History ==
There is a long history of the form and function of the vase in nearly all developed cultures, and often ceramic objects are the only artistic evidence left from vanished cultures. In the beginning stages of pottery, the coiling method of building was the most utilized technique to make pottery. The coiling method is the act of working the clay into long cylindrical strips that later become smooth walls.

== Potter's wheel ==
The potter's wheel was probably invented in Mesopotamia by the 4th millennium BCE, but spread across nearly all Eurasia and much of Africa, though it remained unknown in the New World until the arrival of Europeans. The earliest discovery of the origins of the potter's wheel was in southern Iraq. The discovery of this technique was beneficial to the people of south Iraq because it served as a substitute for their previous inefficient traditions. Upon this new technique, it would then grow gradually and even be adopted for the use of decorating pottery.

== Garden vase ==
Garden vases are usually V-shaped but they can also be cylindrical or bowl-shaped. They are usually made of ceramic or, today, plastic. Examples are the Torlonia Vase and the Medici Vase in the Uffizi Gallery in Florence.

== Shapes ==
Ancient Greece:
- Amphora
- Hydria
- Krater
- Lekythos
- Oinochoe
- Olpe

Chinese:

- Meiping

Modern:

- Bottle
- Cylinder-shaped vase
- Flower brick
- Gourd-shaped vase
- Jar
- Pitcher
- Rotund vase
- Turnip-shaped vase
- Urn
- V-shaped
- U-shaped

A bud vase is a flower vase with a narrow neck, that is intended to hold just one or two flowers at a time. A bud vase can be as simple as a glass tube with a weighted base or may have a more elaborate form.

== Gallery ==
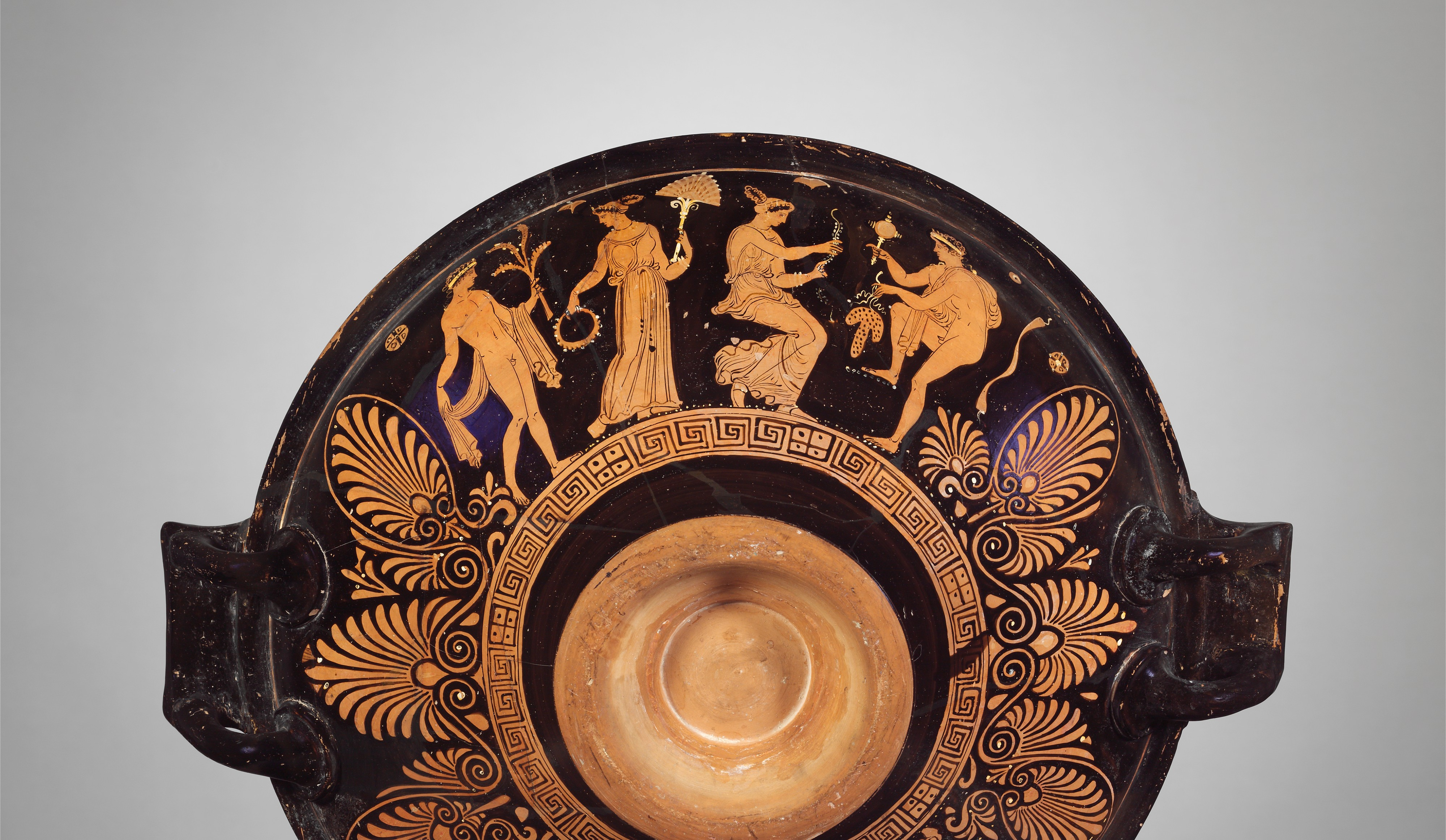
Detail of a red-figure lekanis; 365–350 BC; terracotta; Metropolitan Museum of Art (New York City)

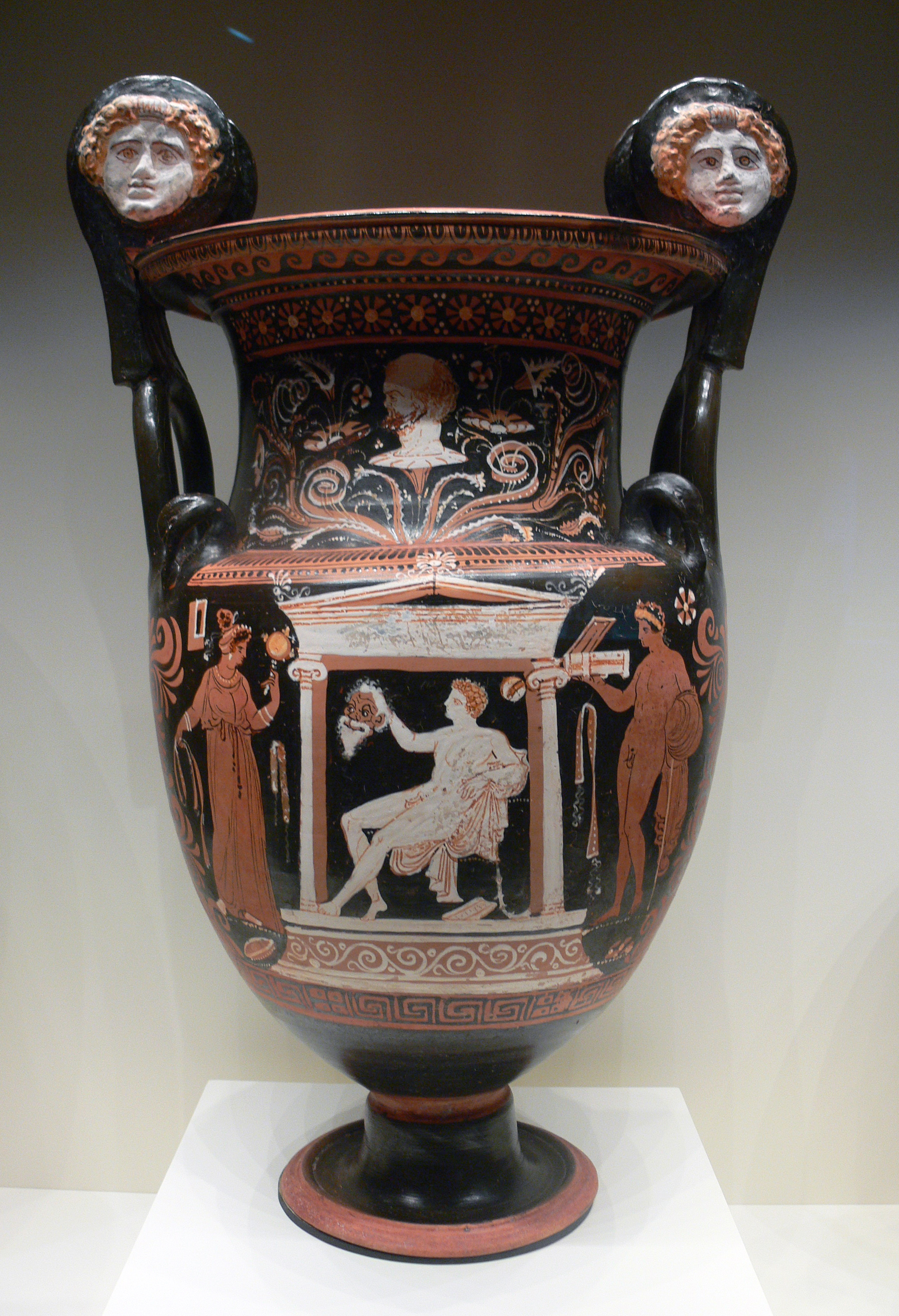
Red-figure mixing vessel; 330-320 BC; terracotta; from Apulia (south Italy); Getty Villa (Los Angeles, USA)

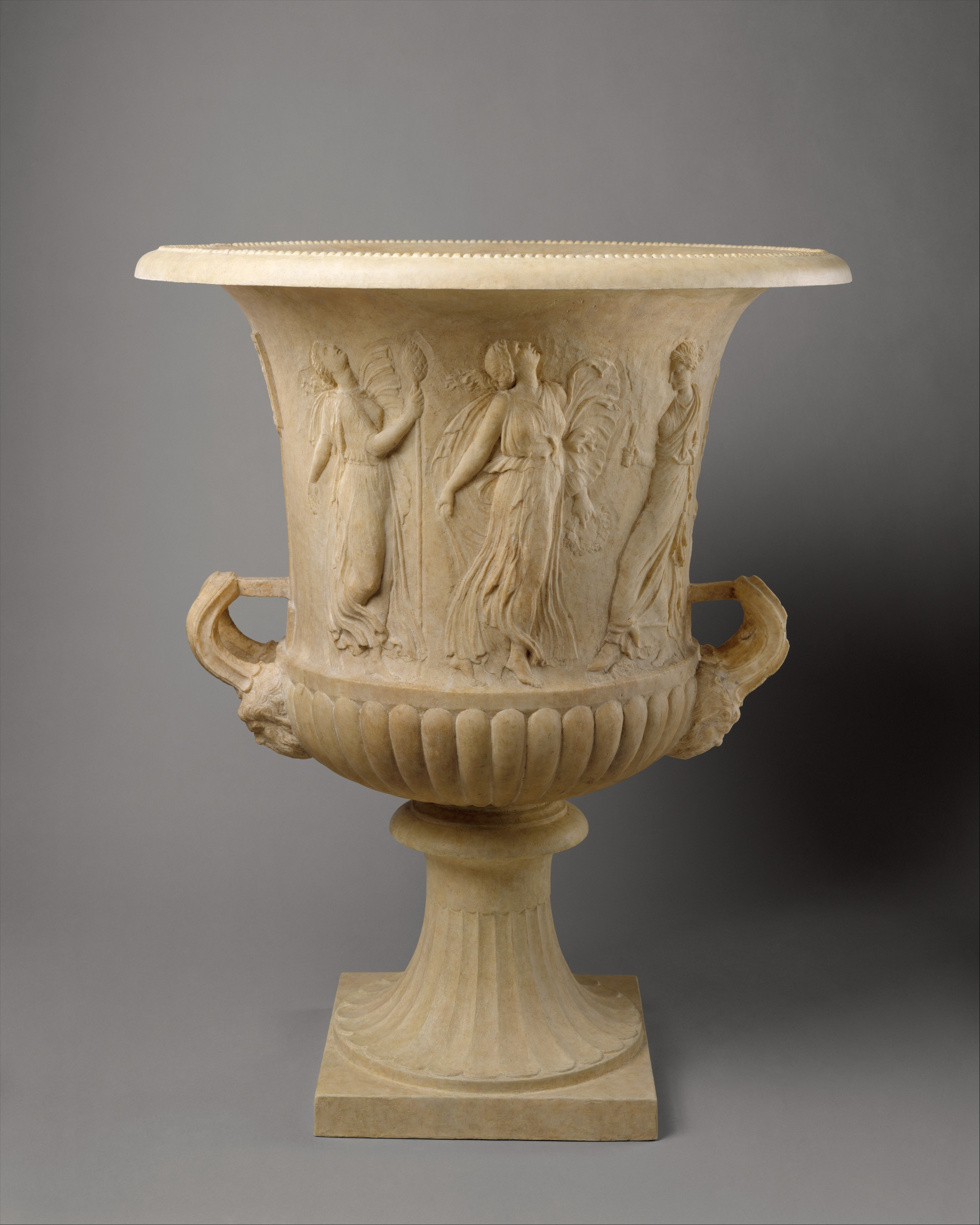
Roman calyx krater with reliefs of maidens and dancing maenads; 1st century AD; Pentelic marble; height: 80.7 cm; Metropolitan Museum of Art

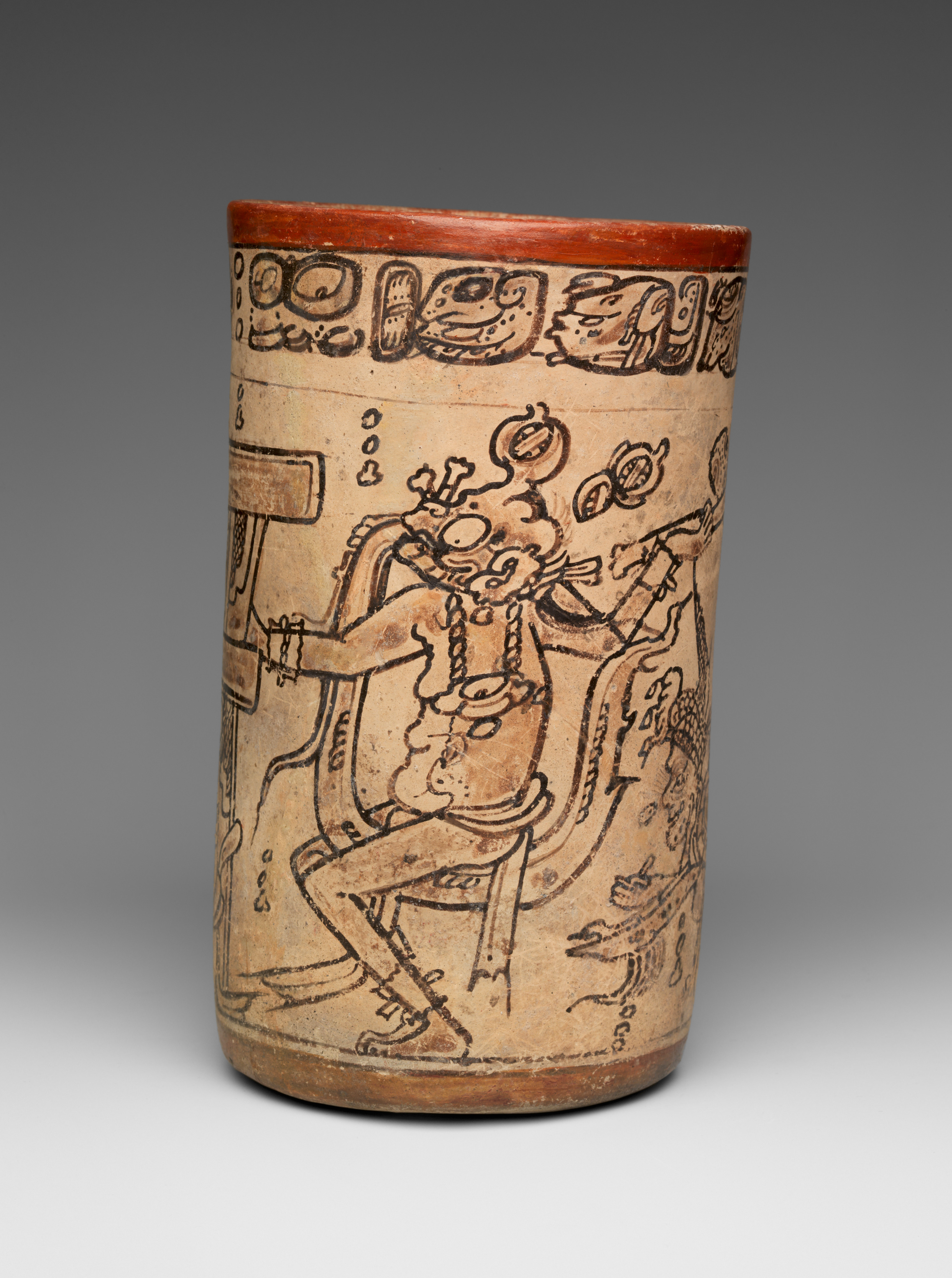
Maya codex-style vase with a mythological scene; 7th–8th century; ceramic; height: 19 cm, diameter: 11.2 cm; Metropolitan Museum of Art

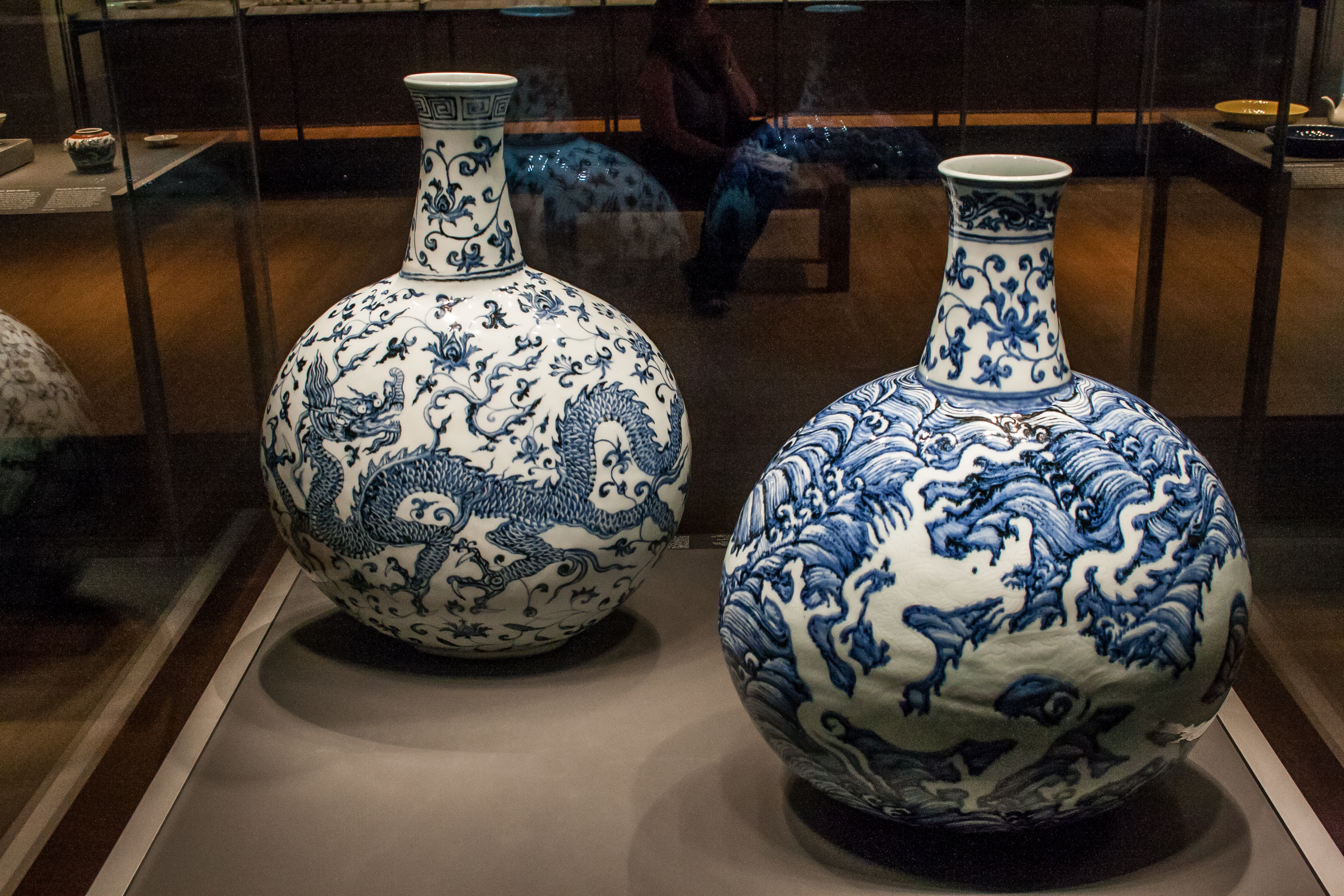
Two Chinese flasks with dragons; 1403–1424; underglaze blue porcelain; height (the left one): 47.8 cm, height (the right one): 44.6 cm; British Museum (London)

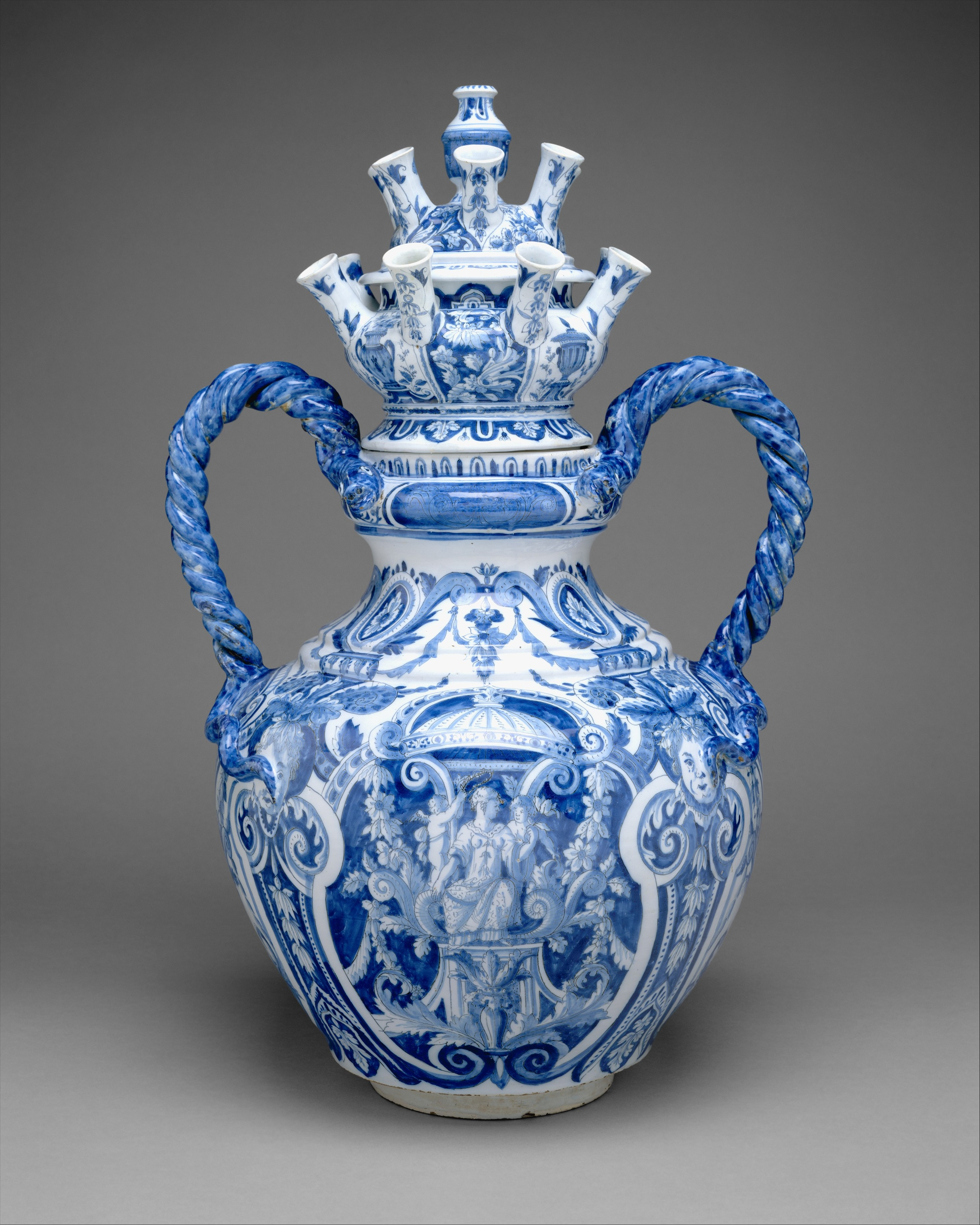
An example of Delftware; circa 1690; tin-glazed earthenware; height: 72.4 cm; Metropolitan Museum of Art

Chinese vase with three rams' heads; 1736–1795; cloisonné enamel; diameter: 9.4 cm, overall: 14 cm; from Jingdezhen (Jiangxi province, China); Cleveland Museum of Art (Cleveland, Ohio, USA)

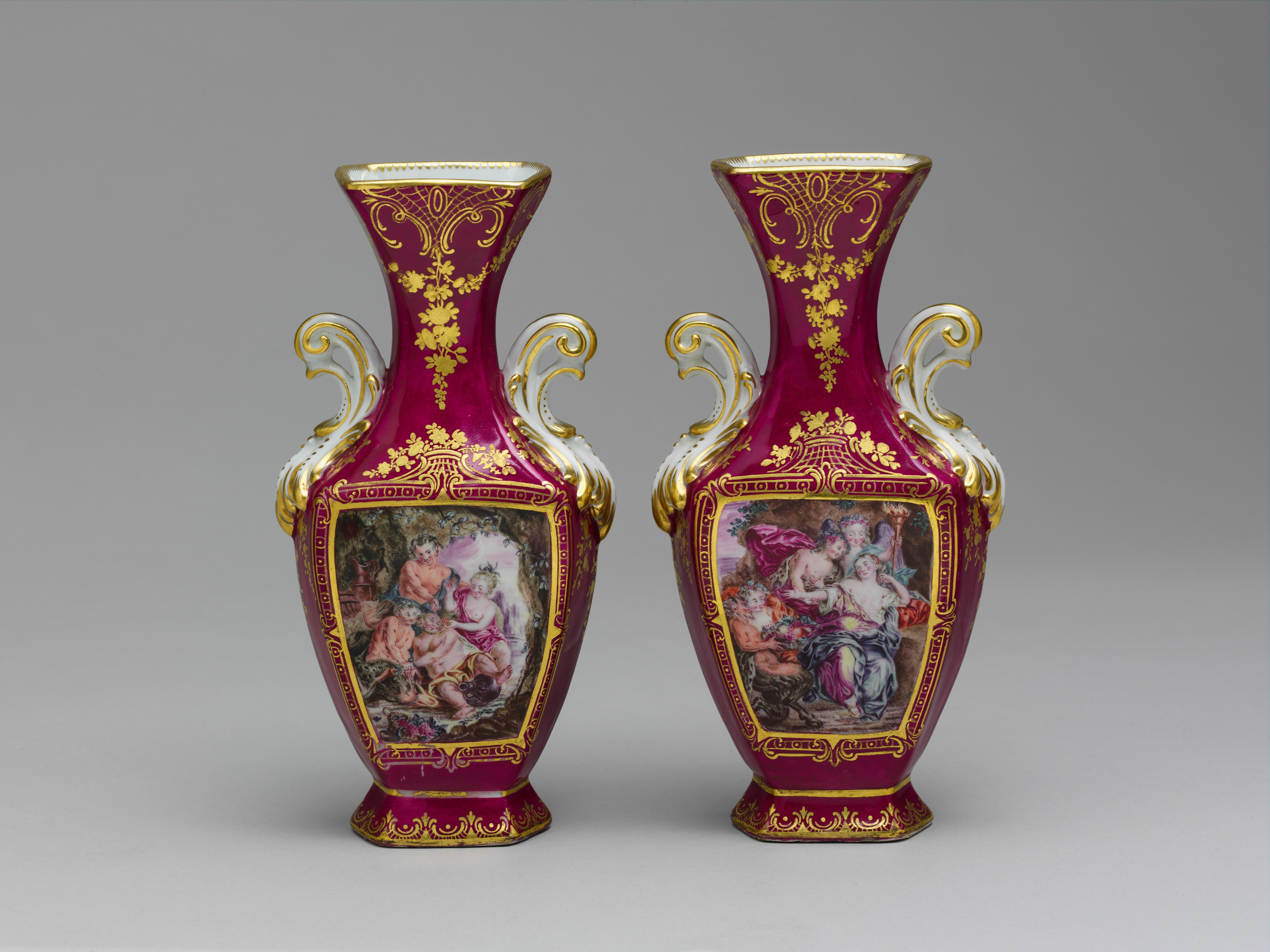
Rococo vase; circa 1761; soft paste porcelain; height: 24.1 cm; Metropolitan Museum of Art

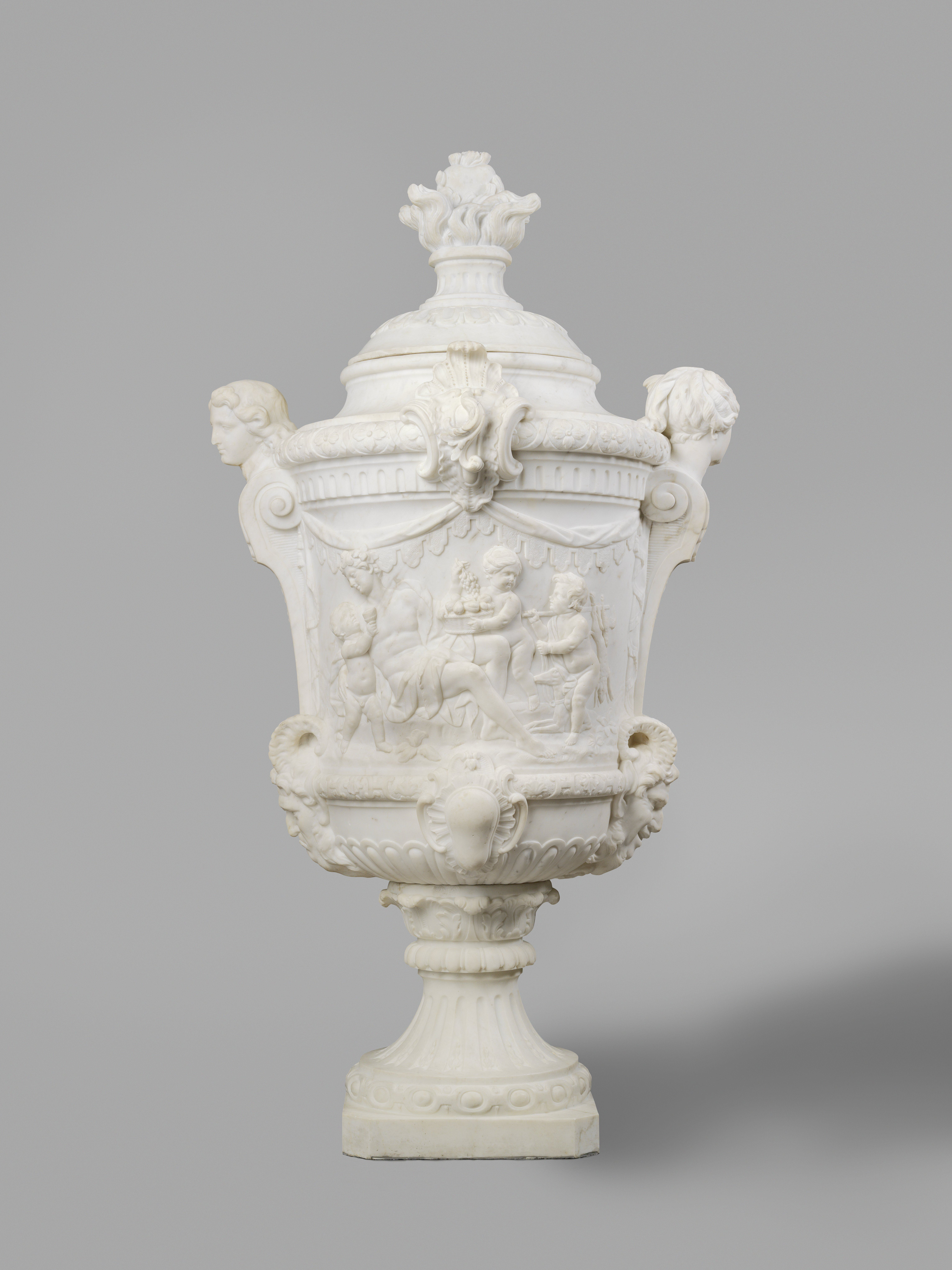
Garden vase decorated with summer and autumn; 1714; marble; height: 146 cm; Rijksmuseum (Amsterdam, the Netherlands)

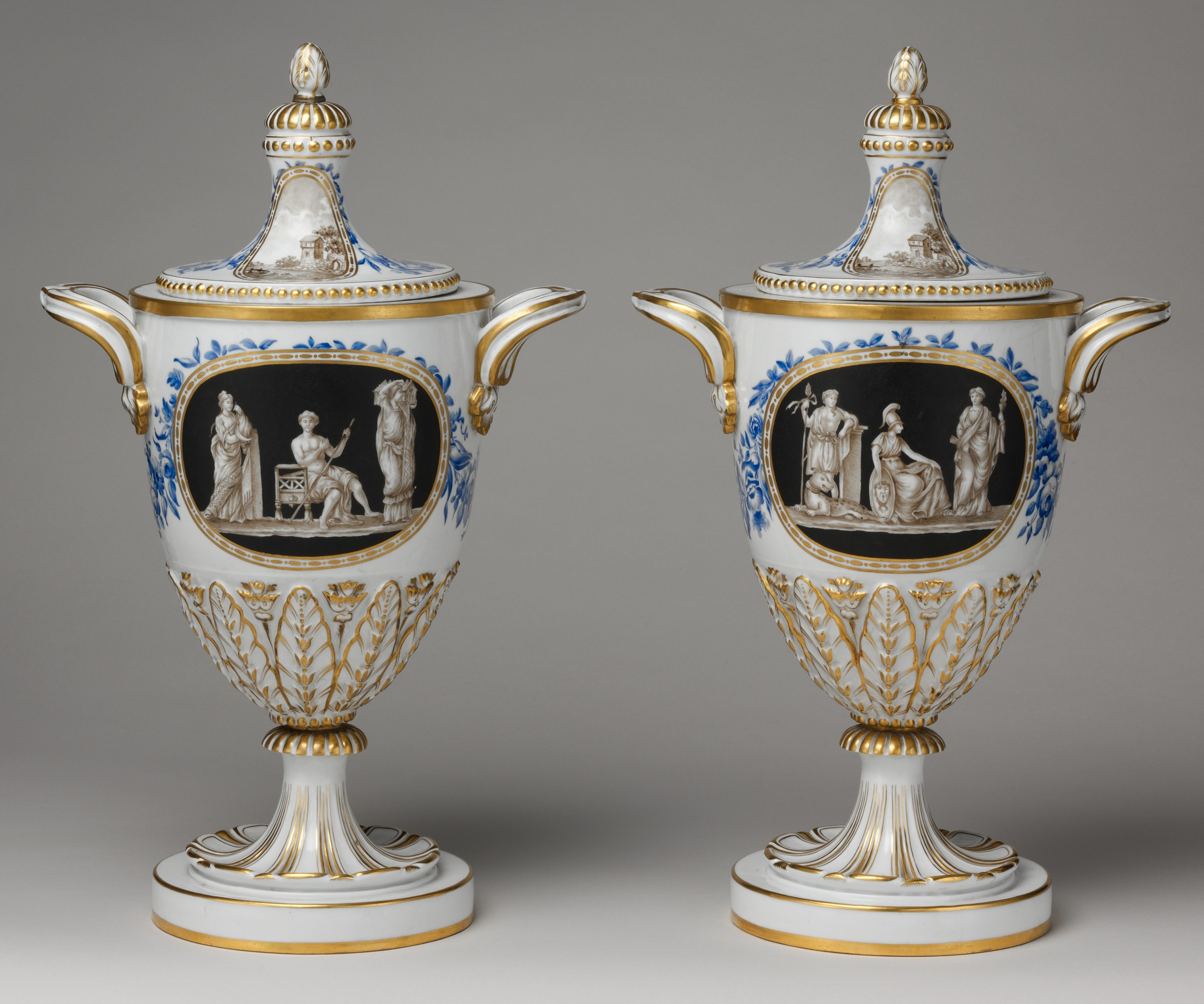
Neoclassical vases with covers; 1784–1795; soft-paste porcelain; height (with cover): 47.6 cm; made at the Real Fábrica del Buen Retiro; Metropolitan Museum of Art

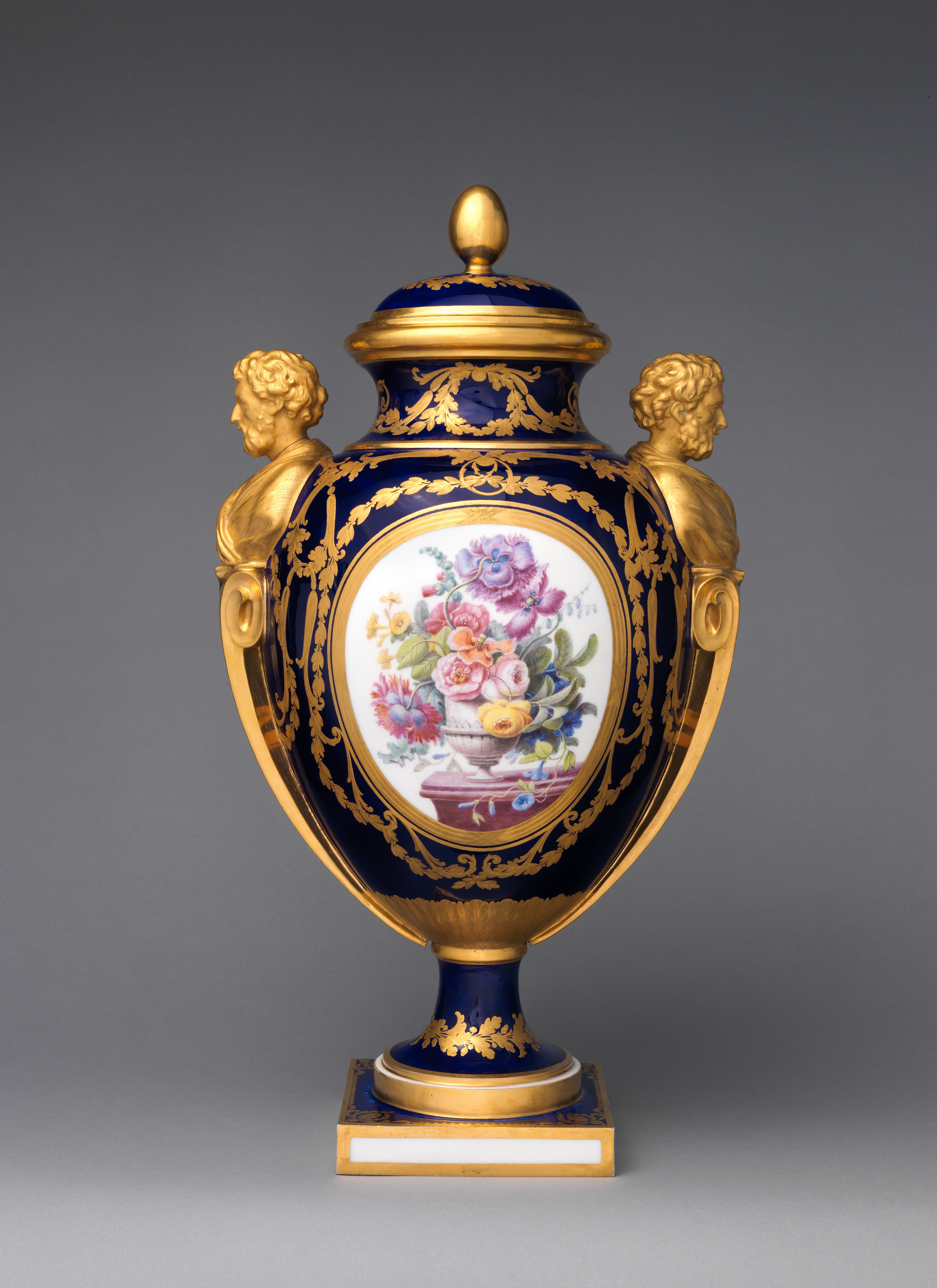
French vase with cover (vase des âges); 1788; soft-paste porcelain; height: 49.5 cm; Metropolitan Museum of Art

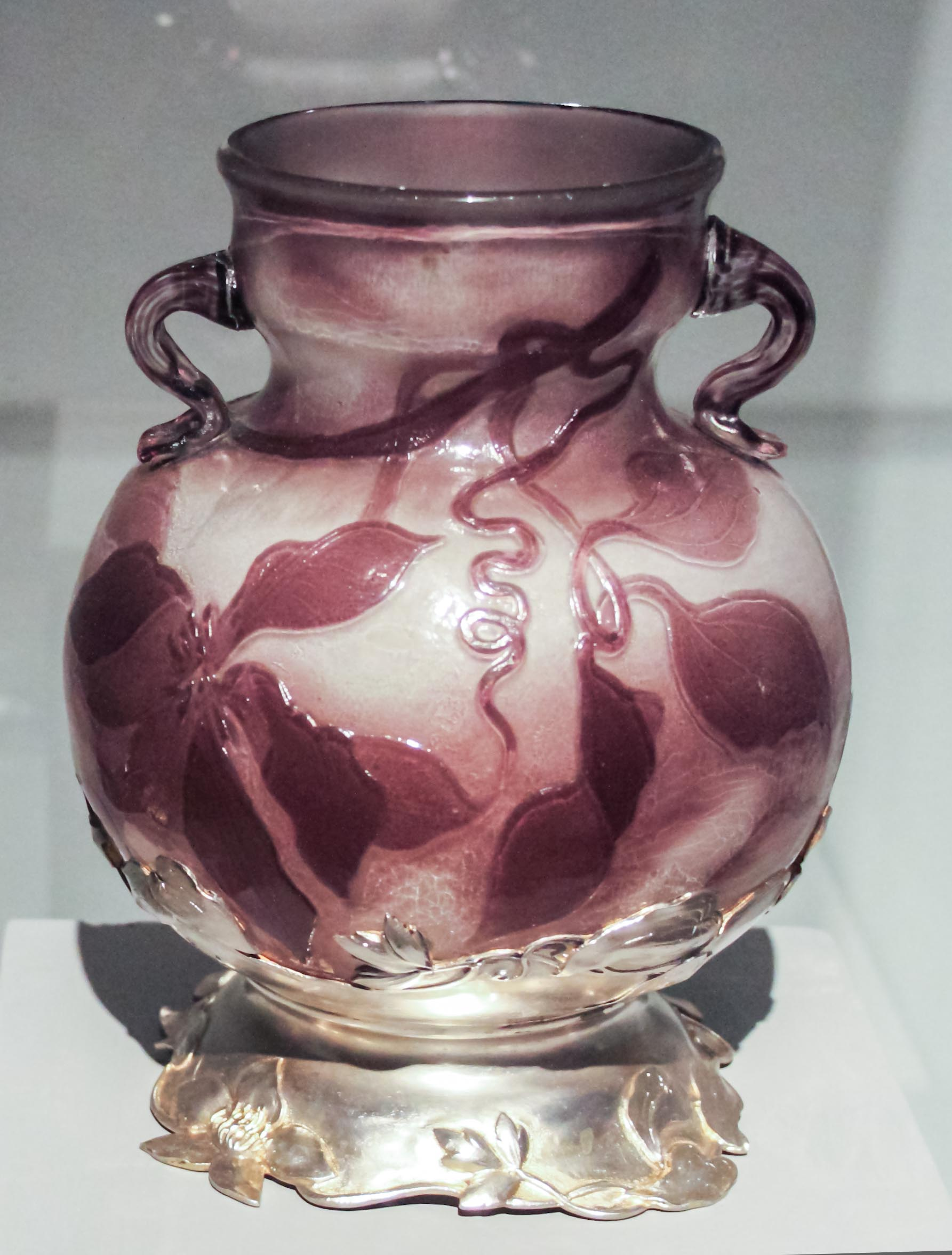
Art Nouveau vase with clematis flowers; by Émile Gallé; circa 1900; from Nancy; Budapest Museum of Applied Arts (Budapest, Hungary)

== Material types ==
- Ceramic
- Crystal
- Glass
- Metal
- Plastic
- Porcelain
- Wood

== See also ==
- Ceramic art
- Corning Museum of Glass
- Pottery
- Urn
