= Tin-glazed pottery =

Pottery covered in glaze containing tin oxide

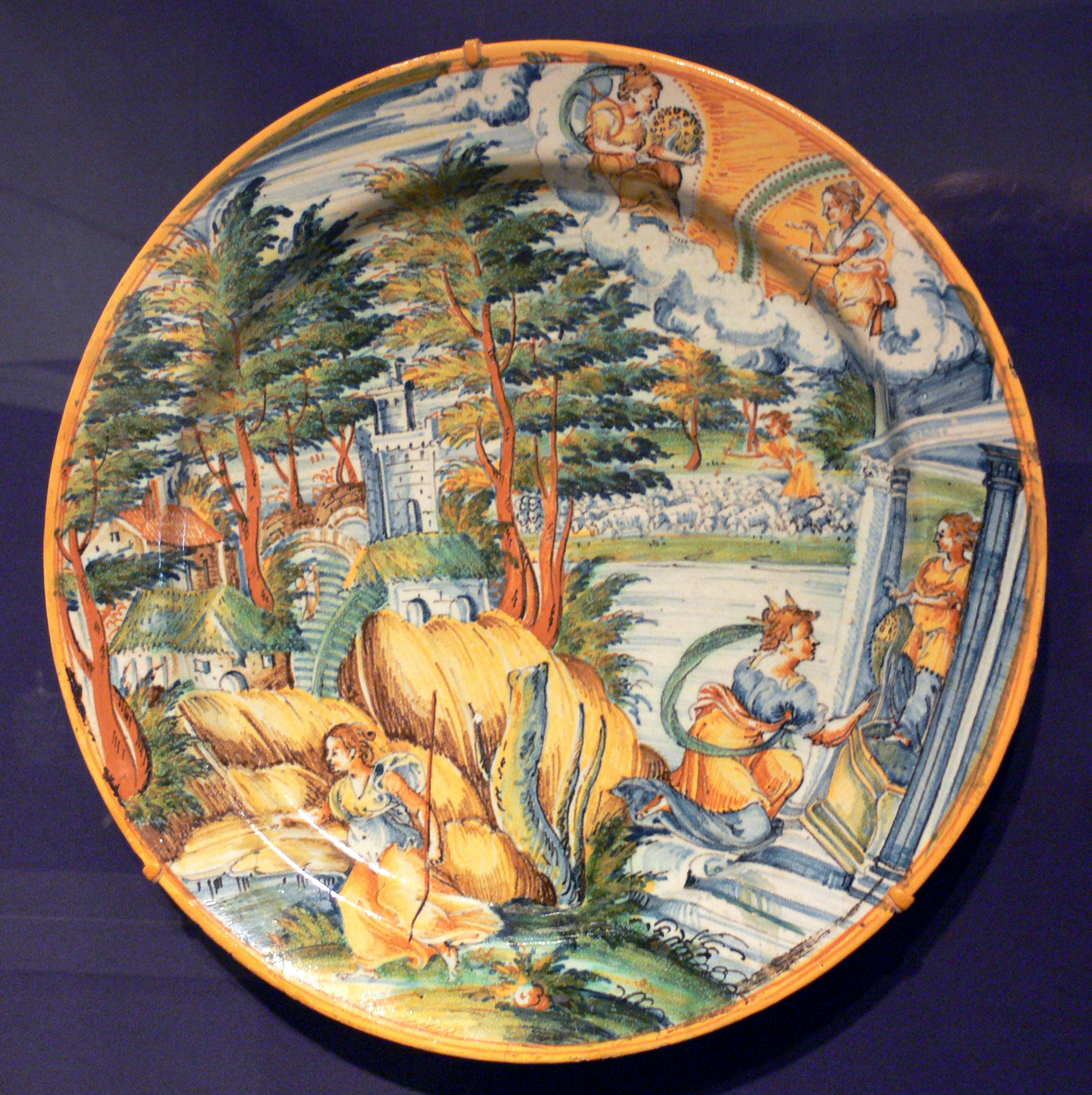
Maiolica charger from Faenza, after which faience is named, c. 1555; diameter 43 cm, tin-glazed earthenware

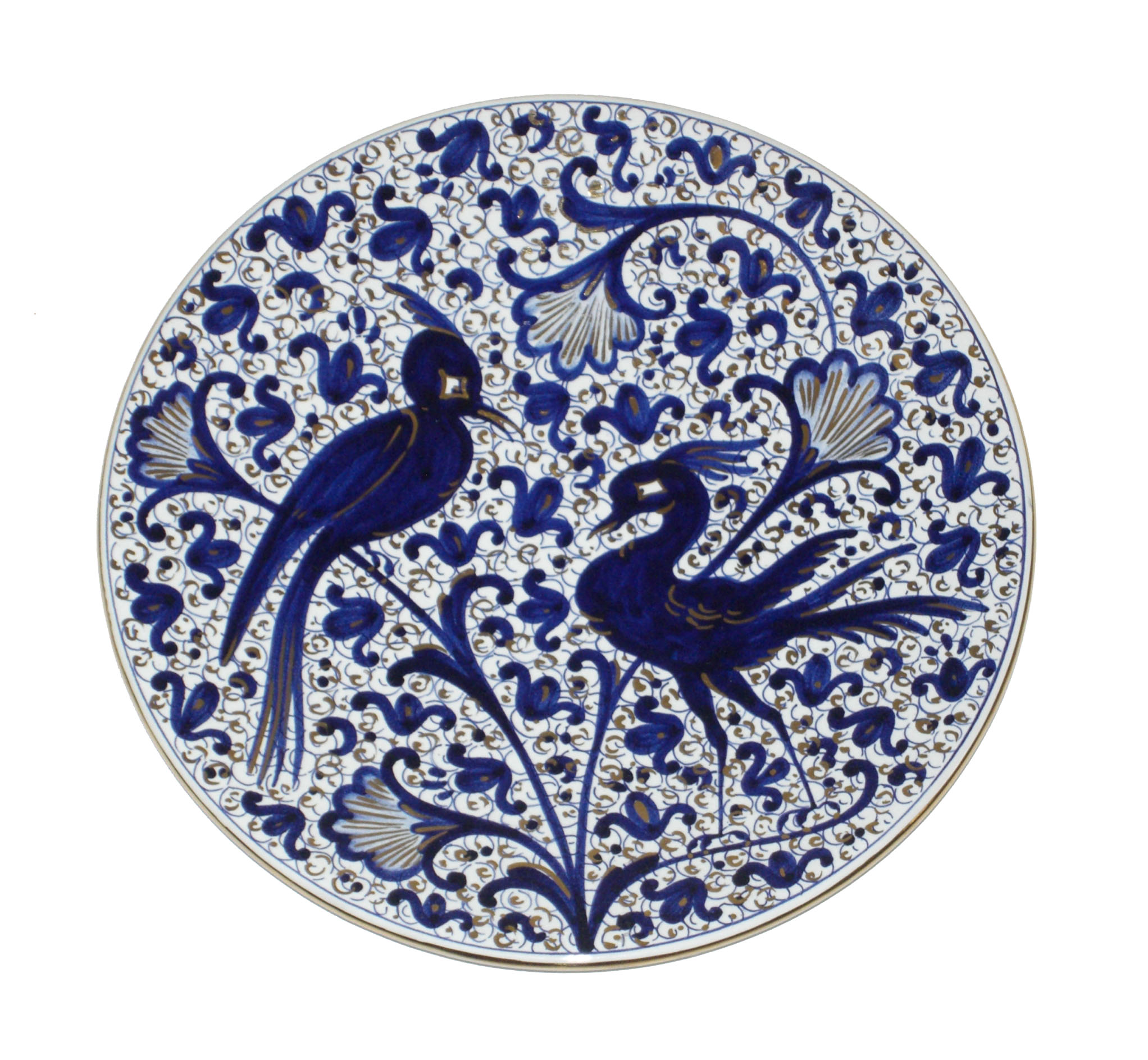
Tin-glazed (majolica/maiolica) plate from Faenza, Italy

Tin-glazed pottery is earthenware covered in lead glaze with added tin oxide which is white, shiny and opaque (see tin-glazing for the chemistry); usually this provides a background for brightly painted decoration. It has been important in Islamic and European pottery, but very little used in East Asia. The pottery body is usually made of red or buff-colored earthenware and the white glaze imitated Chinese porcelain. The decoration on tin-glazed pottery is usually applied to the unfired glaze surface by brush with metallic oxides, commonly cobalt oxide, copper oxide, iron oxide, manganese dioxide and antimony oxide. The makers of Italian tin-glazed pottery from the late Renaissance blended oxides to produce detailed and realistic polychrome paintings.

The earliest tin-glazed pottery appears to have been made in Iraq in the 9th century, the oldest fragments having been excavated during the First World War from the palace of Samarra about fifty miles north of Baghdad. From there it spread to Egypt, Persia and Spain before reaching Italy in mid-15th century, early Renaissance, Holland in the 16th century and England, France and other European countries shortly after.

The development of white, or near white, firing bodies in Europe from the late 18th century, such as creamware by Josiah Wedgwood, and increasingly cheap European porcelain and Chinese export porcelain, reduced the demand for tin-glaze Delftware, faience and majolica.

The rise in the cost of tin oxide during the First World War led to its partial substitution by zirconium compounds in the glaze.

== Names ==
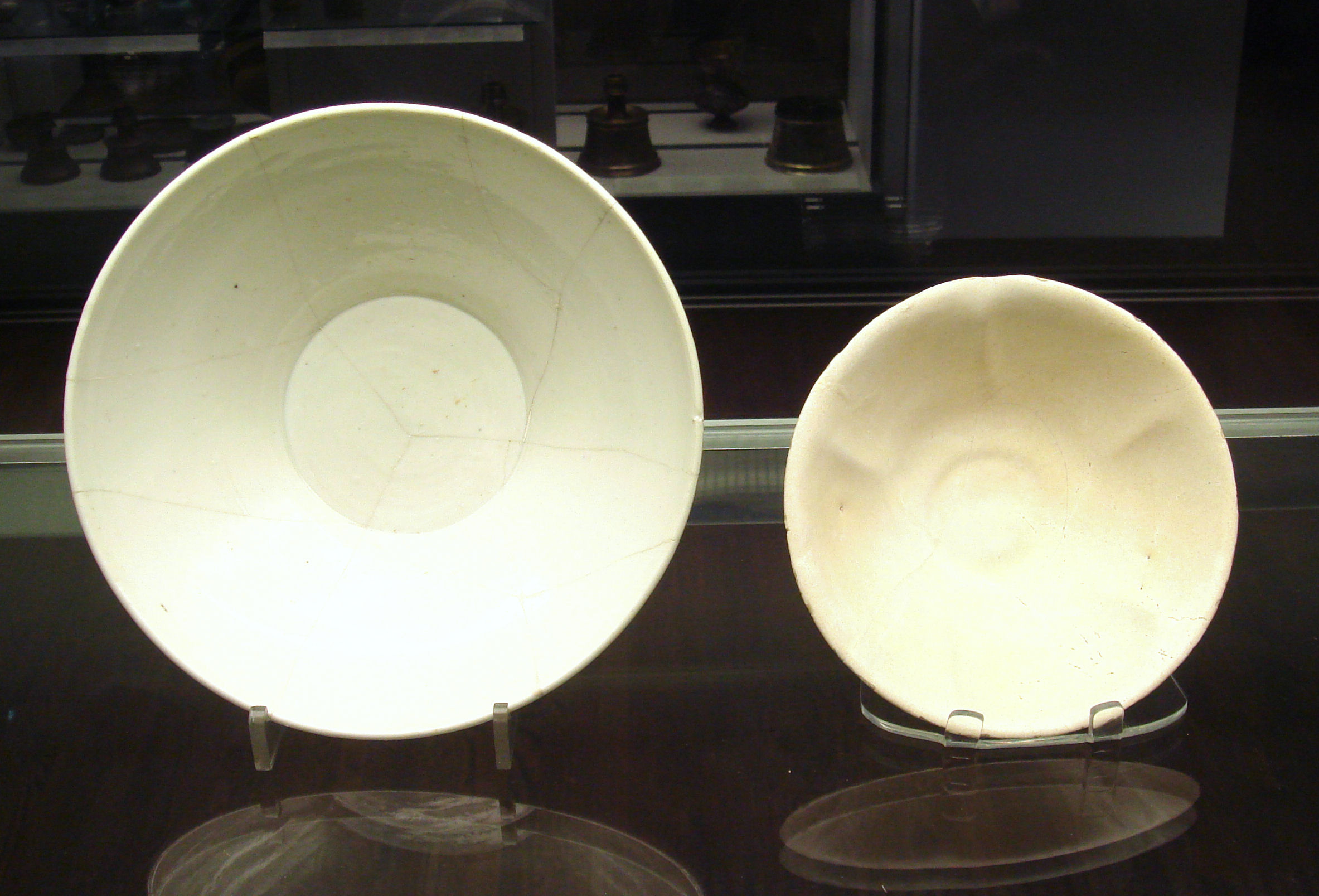
Chinese porcelain white ware bowl (left), not tin-glazed, found in Iran, and Iraqi tin-glazed earthenware bowl (right) found in Iraq, both 9–10th century, an example of Chinese influences on Islamic pottery. British Museum.

Tin-glazed pottery of different periods and styles is known by different names. The pottery from Muslim Spain is known as Hispano-Moresque ware. The decorated tin-glaze of Renaissance Italy is called maiolica, sometimes pronounced and spelt majolica by English speakers and authors. When the technique was taken up in the Netherlands, it became known as delftware as much of it was made in the town of Delft. Dutch potters brought it to England in around 1600, and wares produced there are known as English delftware or galleyware. In France it was known as faience after the Italian city of Faenza which was a major production center from where French artisans had learned the technique.

The word maiolica is thought to have come from the medieval Italian word for Mallorca, an island on the route for ships that brought Hispano-Moresque wares to Italy from Valencia in the 15th and 16th centuries, or from the Spanish obra de Mallequa, the term for lustered ware made in Valencia under the influence of Moorish craftsmen from Malaga. During the Renaissance, the term maiolica was adopted for Italian-made luster pottery copying Spanish examples, and, during the 16th century, its meaning shifted to include all tin-glazed earthenware.

Because of their identical names, there has been some confusion between tin-glazed majolica/maiolica and the lead-glazed majolica made in England and America in the 19th century, but they are different in origin, technique, style and history. In the late 18th century, old Italian tin-glazed maiolica became popular among the British, who referred to it by the anglicized pronunciation majolica. The Minton pottery copied it and applied the term majolica ware to their product. At the Great Exhibition of 1851, Minton launched the colorful lead-glazed earthenware which they called Palissy ware, soon also to become known as majolica. So now there were two distinct products with the same name. "In the 1870s, the curators of the South Kensington Museum returned to the original Italian 'maiolica' with an 'i' to describe all Italian tin-glazed earthenware, doubtless to stress the Italian pronunciation and to avoid confusion with contemporary majolica."

A style of brightly coloured 19th-century lead-glazed earthenware was also called "majolica", and is now known as Victorian majolica

W.B. Honey (Keeper of Ceramics at the Victoria & Albert Museum, 1938–1950) wrote of maiolica that, "By a convenient extension and limitation the name may be applied to all tin-glazed ware, of whatever nationality, made in the Italian tradition … the name faïence (or the synonymous English 'delftware') being reserved for the later wares of the 17th Century onwards, either in original styles (as in the case of the French) or, more frequently, in the Dutch-Chinese (Delft) tradition." The term maiolica is sometimes applied to modern tin-glazed ware made by studio potters.

== Hispano-Moresque ware ==
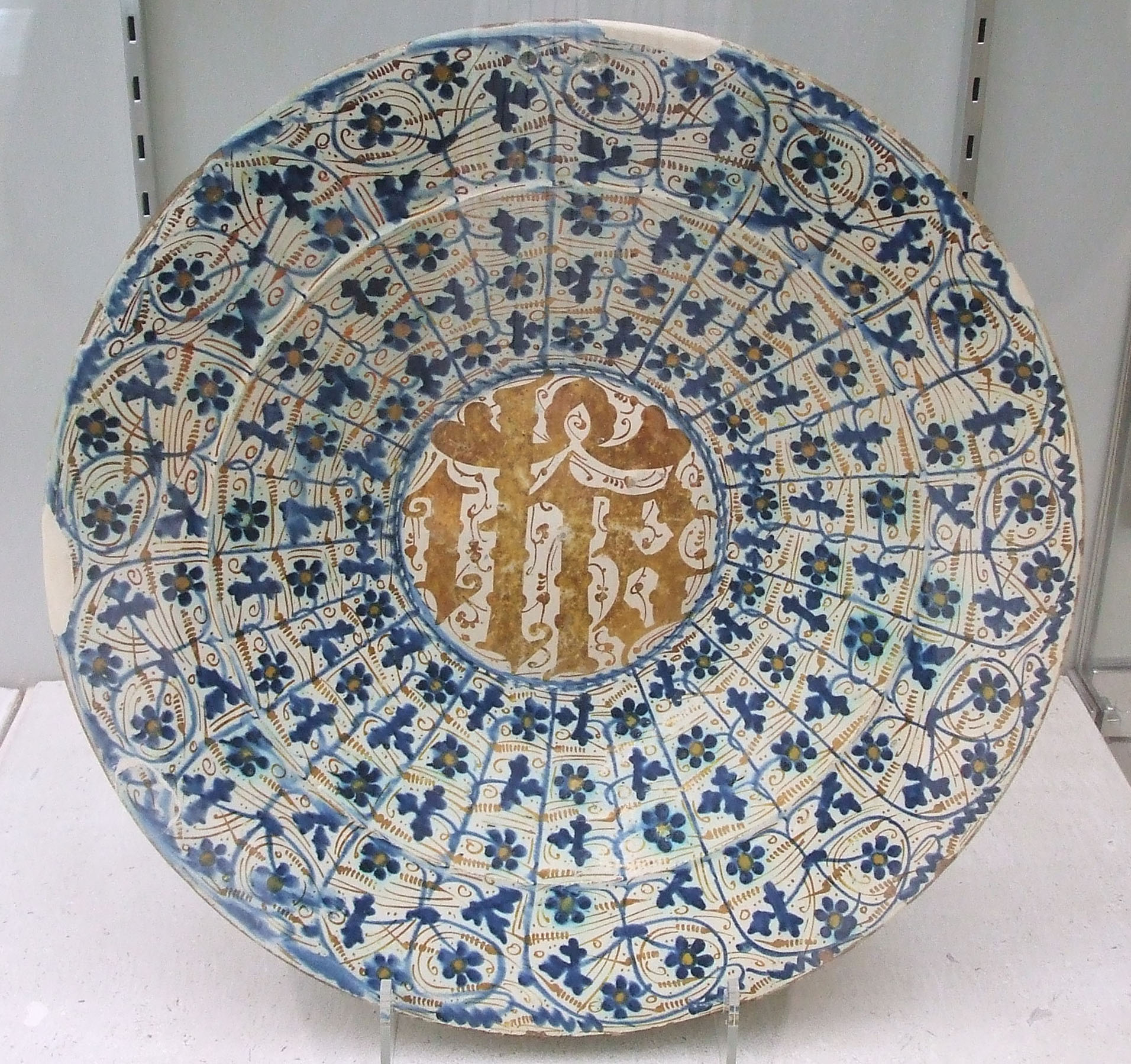
A Hispano-Moresque dish, approx 32 cm diameter, with Christian monogram "IHS", decorated in cobalt blue and gold luster. Valencia, c. 1430–1500. Burrell Collection, Glasgow

The Moors introduced tin-glazed pottery to Spain after the conquest of 711.

Hispano-Moresque ware is generally distinguished from the pottery of Christendom by the Islamic character of its decoration, though as the dish illustrated shows, it was also made for the Christian market.

Hispano-Moresque shapes of the 15th century included the albarello (a tall jar), luster dishes with coats of arms, made for wealthy Italians and Spaniards, jugs, some on high feet (the citra and the grealet), a deep-sided dish (the lebrillo de alo) and the eared bowl (cuenco de oreja).

With the Spanish conquest of Mexico, tin-glazed pottery came to be produced in the Valley of Mexico as early as 1540, at first in imitation of the ceramics imported from Seville.

Although the Moors were expelled from Spain in the early 17th century, the Hispano-Moresque style survived in the province of Valencia. Later wares usually have a coarse reddish-buff body, dark blue decoration and luster.

== Maiolica ==
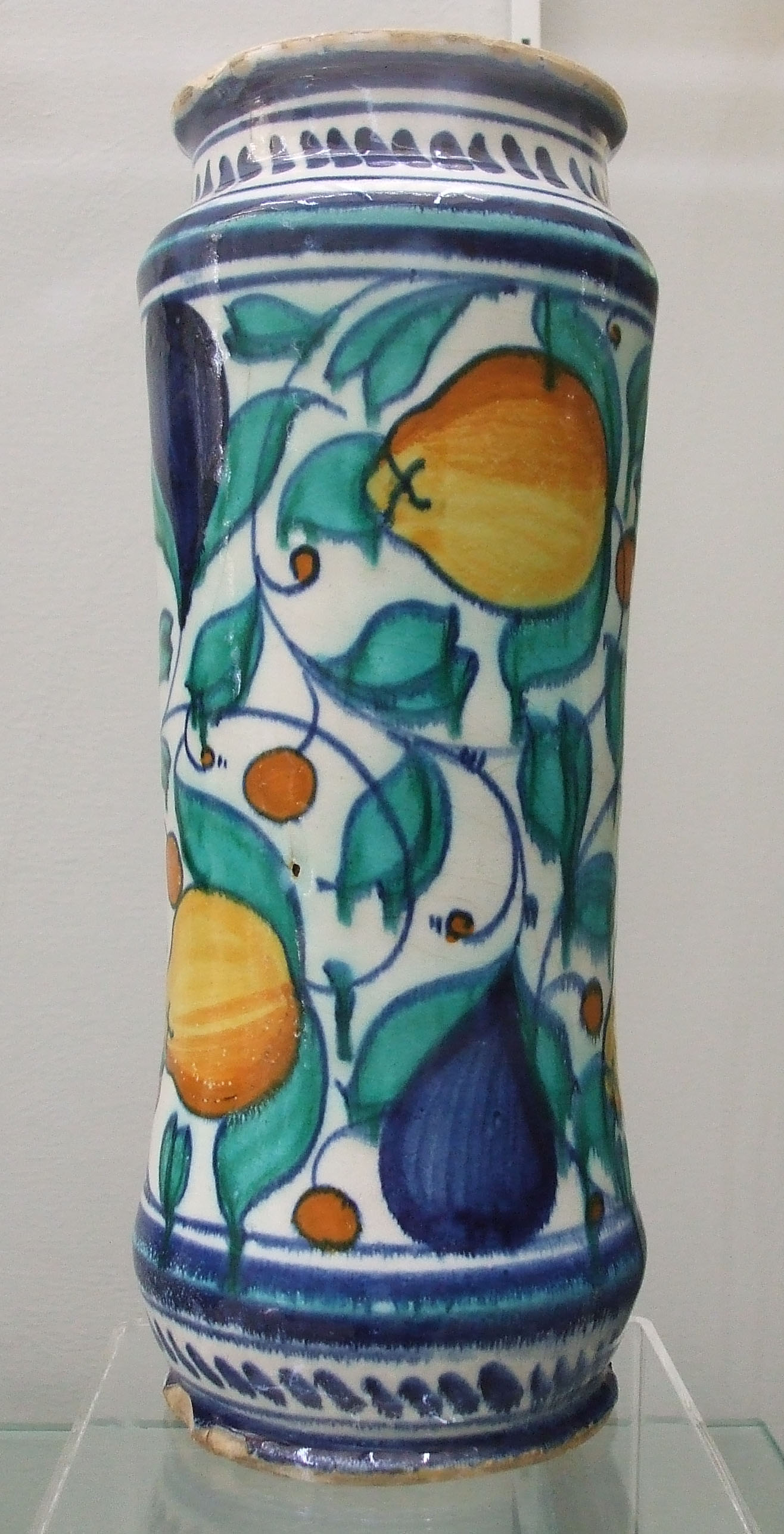
An albarello (drug jar) from Venice or Castel Durante, 16th century. Approx 30cm high. Decorated in cobalt blue, copper green, antimony yellow and yellow ochre. Burrell Collection

The 15th-century wares that initiated maiolica as an art form were the product of a long technical evolution, in which medieval lead-glazed wares were improved by the addition of tin oxides under the initial influence of Islamic wares imported through Sicily. Such archaic wares are sometimes dubbed proto-maiolica. During the later 14th century, the limited palette of colors was expanded from the traditional manganese purple and copper green to embrace cobalt blue, antimony yellow and iron-oxide orange. Sgraffito wares were also produced, in which the white tin-oxide slip was decoratively scratched to produce a design from the revealed body of the ware.

Refined production of tin-glazed earthenware made for more than local needs was concentrated in central Italy from the later 13th century, especially in the contada of Florence. The importance of the city itself in the production of maiolica declined in the second half of the 15th century, perhaps because of local deforestation. Italian cities encouraged the start of a new pottery industry by offering tax relief, citizenship, monopoly rights and protection from outside imports. Production scattered among small communes and, after the mid-15th century, at Faenza, Arezzo and Siena. Faenza, which gave its name to faience, was the only fair-sized city in which the ceramic industry became a major economic component. Bologna produced lead-glazed wares for export. Orvieto and Deruta both produced maioliche in the 15th century. In the 16th century, maiolica production was established at Castel Durante, Urbino, Gubbio and Pesaro. Some maiolica was produced as far north as Padua, Venice and Turin and as far south as Palermo and Caltagirone in Sicily. In the 17th century Savona began to be a prominent place of manufacture.

Some of the principal centres of production (e.g. Deruta and Montelupo) still produce maiolica, which is sold in quantity in Italian tourist areas.

== Delftware ==
Delftware was made in the Netherlands from the 16th to the 18th centuries. The main period of manufacture was 1600-1780, after which it was succeeded by white stoneware and porcelain.

The earliest tin-glazed pottery in the Netherlands was made in Antwerp in 1512. The manufacture of painted pottery may have spread from the southern to the northern Netherlands in the 1560s. It was made in Middleburg and Haarlem in the 1570s and in Amsterdam in the 1580s. Much of the finer work was produced in Delft, but simple everyday tin-glazed pottery was made in such places as Gouda, Rotterdam, Amsterdam and Dordrecht.

The Guild of St. Luke, to which painters in all media had to belong, admitted ten master potters in the thirty years between 1610 and 1640 and twenty in the nine years 1651 to 1660. In 1654 a gunpowder explosion in Delft destroyed many breweries, and, as the brewing industry was in decline, their premises became available to pottery makers.

From about 1615, the potters began to coat their pots completely in white tin glaze instead of covering only the painting surface and coating the rest with clear glaze. They then began to cover the tin glaze with a coat of clear glaze which gave depth to the fired surface and smoothness to cobalt blues, ultimately creating a good resemblance to porcelain.

Although Dutch potters did not immediately imitate Chinese porcelain, they began to do after the death of the Emperor Wan-Li in 1619, when the supply to Europe was interrupted. Delftware inspired by Chinese originals persisted from about 1630 to the mid-18th century alongside European patterns.

Delftware ranged from simple household items to fancy artwork. Pictorial plates were made in abundance, illustrated with religious motifs, native Dutch scenes with windmills and fishing boats, hunting scenes, landscapes and seascapes. The Delft potters also made tiles in vast numbers (estimated at eight hundred million over a period of two hundred years); many Dutch houses still have tiles that were fixed in the 17th and 18th centuries.

Delftware became popular, was widely exported in Europe and reached China and Japan. Chinese and Japanese potters made porcelain versions of Delftware for export to Europe.

By the late 18th century, Delftware potters had lost their market to British porcelain and the new white earthenware.

There are good collections of old Delftware in the Rijksmuseum in Amsterdam and the Victoria and Albert Museum in London.

== English delftware ==
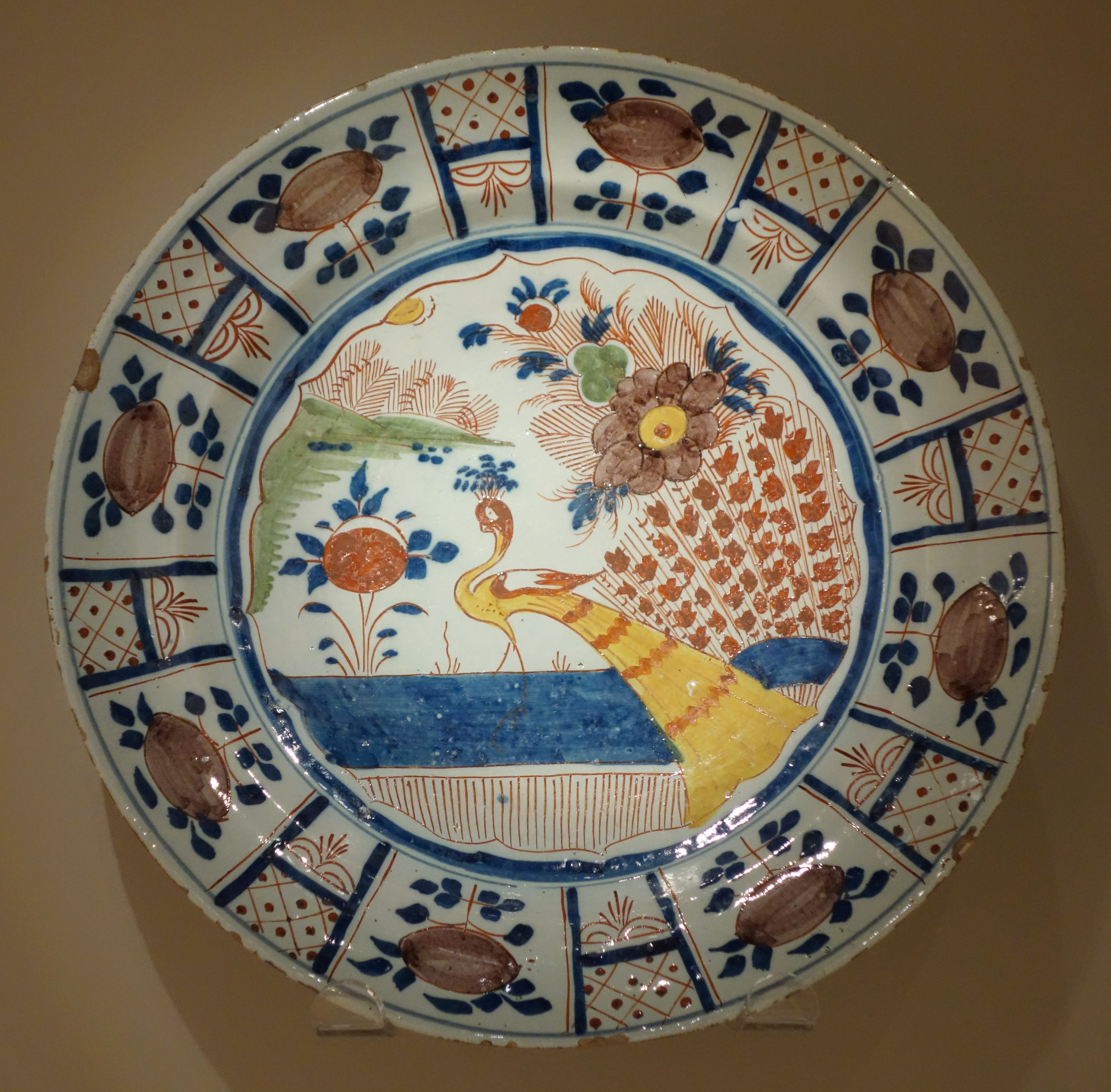
Charger, English delftware, 1730-1740, the decoration here an early and charmingly naive attempt at chinoiserie

English delftware was made in the British Isles between about 1550 and the late 18th century. The main centers of production were London, Bristol and Liverpool with smaller centers at Wincanton, Glasgow and Dublin.

John Stow's Survey of London (1598) records the arrival in 1567 of two Antwerp potters, Jasper Andries and Jacob Jansen, in Norwich, where they made "Gally Paving Tiles, and vessels for Apothecaries and others, very artificially". In 1579 Jansen applied to Queen Elizabeth I for the sole right to practice "galleypotting" (at the time "galliware" was the term in English for delftware) in London and soon set up a workshop at Aldgate to the east of the city. There were already other Flemish potters in London, two of them in Southwark recorded in 1571 as "painters of pottes".

English delftware pottery and its painted decoration is similar in many respects to that from Holland, but its peculiarly English quality has been commented upon: "... there is a relaxed tone and a sprightliness which is preserved throughout the history of English delftware; the overriding mood is provincial and naive rather than urbane and sophisticated." Its methods and techniques were less sophisticated than those of its continental counterparts.

The earliest known piece with an English inscription is a dish dated 1600 in the London Museum. It is painted in blue, purple, green, orange and yellow and depicts the Tower of London and Old London Bridge, surrounded by the words, "THE ROSE IS RED THE LEAVES ARE GRENE GOD SAVE ELIZABETH OUR QUEENE" and an Italianate border of masks and leaves. The rim is decorated with dashes of blue and can be considered the first in series of large decorated dishes so painted and called blue-dash chargers. Blue-dash chargers, usually between about 25 and 35 cm in diameter with abstract, floral, religious, patriotic or topographical motifs, were produced in quantity by London and Bristol potters until the early 18th century. As they were kept for decoration on walls, dressers and side-tables, many have survived and they are well represented in museum collections.

Smaller and more everyday wares were also made: paving tiles, mugs, drug jars, dishes, wine bottles, posset pots, salt pots, candlesticks, fuddling cups, (Note: Ale mugs joined in groups of three, four or five with connecting holes to confuse the drinker) puzzle jugs, (Note: Similar to fuddling cups) barber's bowls, pill slabs, bleeding bowls, porringers, and flower bricks.

Towards the end of the 17th century, changing taste led to the replacement of apothecary pots, paving tiles and large dishes by polite tablewares, delicate ornaments, punch bowls, teapots, cocoa pots and coffee-pots.

There are good examples of English delftware in the Victoria and Albert Museum, the British Museum, the Ashmolean Museum and the Fitzwilliam Museum.

== Faience ==
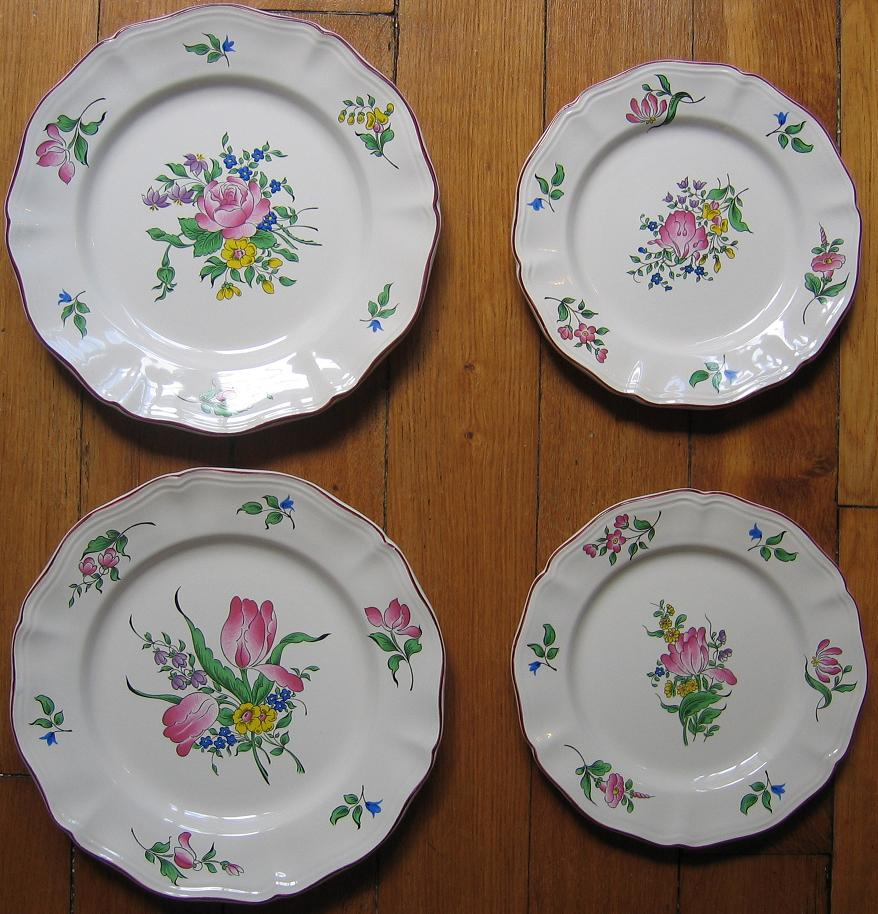
Faience of Lunéville

In France, the first well-known painter of faience was Masseot Abaquesne, established in Rouen in the 1530s. Nevers faience and Rouen faience were the leading French centres of faience manufacturing in the 17th century, both able to supply wares to the standards required by the court and nobility. Many others developed from the early 18th century, led in 1690 by Quimper in Brittany, followed by Moustiers, Marseille, Strasbourg and Lunéville and many smaller centres.

The products of faience manufactories are identified by the usual methods of ceramic connoisseurship: the character of the clay body, the character and palette of the glaze, and the style of decoration, faïence blanche being left in its undecorated fired white slip. Faïence parlante (especially from Nevers) bears mottoes often on decorative labels or banners. Apothecary wares, including albarelli, can bear the names of their intended contents, generally in Latin and often so abbreviated to be unrecognizable to the untutored eye. Mottoes of fellowships and associations became popular in the 18th century, leading to the faïence patriotique that was a specialty of the years of the French Revolution.

The industry was in crisis by the start of the French Revolution in 1789, as production of French porcelain had greatly increased, and its prices were reducing, though it still cost much more than faience. At the same time a commercial treaty with Britain in 1786 led to a flood of imports of English creamware which was not only superior to faience in terms of weight and strength, but cheaper. In the 19th century production revived, but faience was rarely fashionable again.

== Current use ==
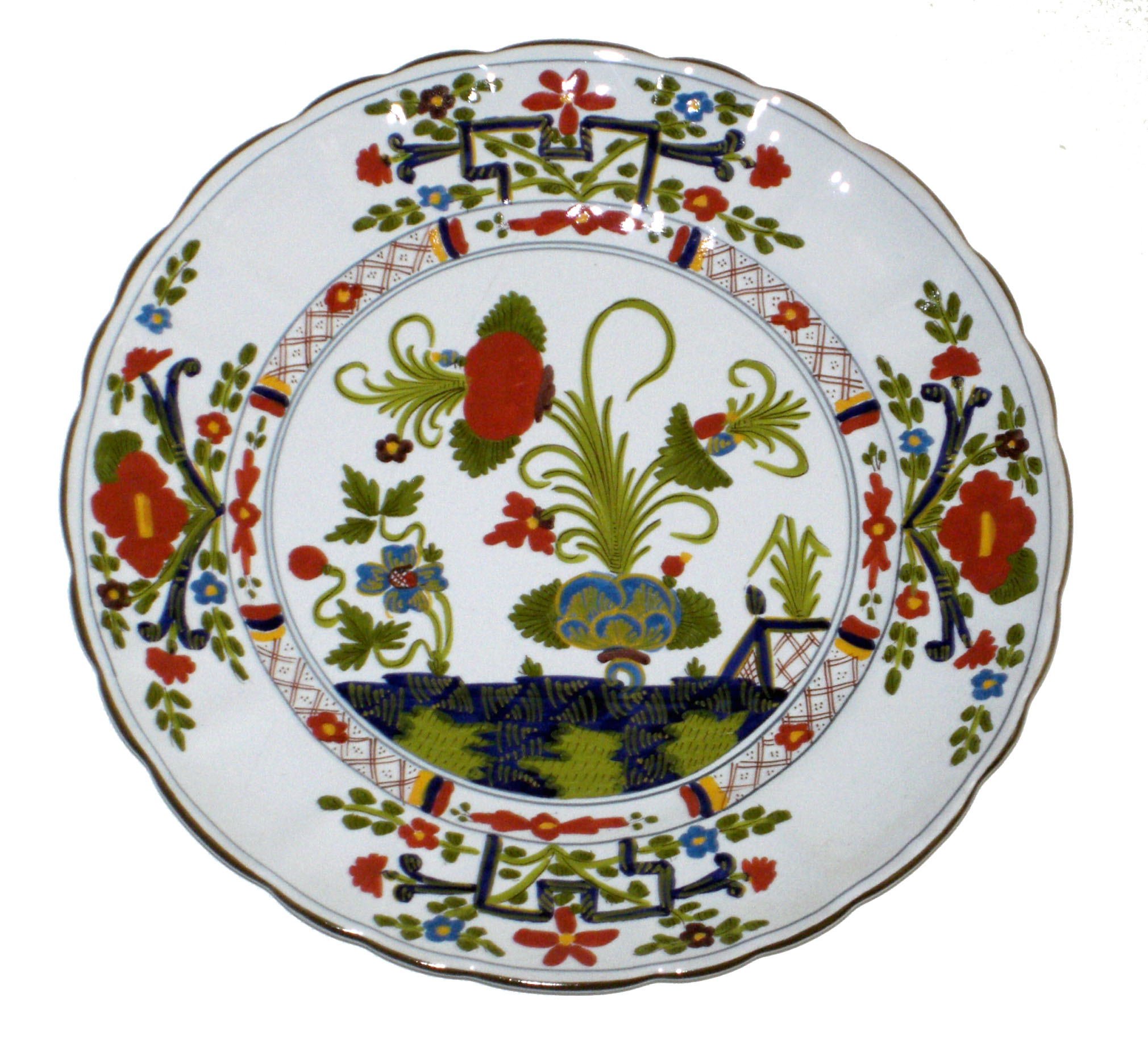
A modern plate from Faenza, adapting a traditional Japanese design

Popular and folk forms have continued in many countries, including the Mexican Talavera.

In the 20th century there were changes in the formulation of tin-glaze and several artist potters began to work in the medium of tin-glazed pottery.

The cost of tin oxide rose considerably during the 1914–1918 war and resulted in a search for cheaper alternatives. The first successful replacement was zirconia and later zircon. Whilst zirconium compounds are not as effective opacifiers as tin oxide, their relatively low price has led to a gradual increase in their use, with an associated reduction in the use of tin oxide. The whiteness resulting from the use of zirconia has been described as more "clinical" than that from tin oxide and is preferred in some applications. Nevertheless, tin oxide still finds use in ceramic manufacture and has been widely used as the opacifier in sanitaryware, with up to 6% used in glazes. Otherwise, tin oxide in glazes, often in conjunction with zircon compounds, is generally restricted to specialist low temperature applications and use by studio potters.

In England at the end of the nineteenth century, William De Morgan re-discovered the technique of firing luster on tin-glaze "to an extraordinarily high standard". Since the beginning of the 20th century there has been a revival of pottery-making in Orvieto and Deruta, the traditional centres of tin-glazed ceramics in Italy, where the shapes and designs of the medieval and renaissance period are reproduced. In the 1920s and 1930s, Roger Fry, Vanessa Bell and Duncan Grant decorated tin-glazed pottery for the Omega Workshops in London. Picasso produced and designed much tin-glazed pottery at Vallauris in the south of France in the 1940s and 1950s. At the Central School of Arts and Crafts, London, Dora Billington encouraged her students, including William Newland and Alan Caiger-Smith, to use tin-glaze decoration. In Britain during the 1950s Caiger-Smith, Margaret Hine, Nicholas Vergette and others including the Rye Pottery made tin-glazed pottery, going against the trend in studio pottery towards stoneware. Subsequently, Caiger-Smith experimented with the technique of reduced lustre on tin glaze, which had been practiced in Italy until 1700 and Spain until 1800 and had then been forgotten. Caiger-Smith trained several potters at his Aldermaston Pottery and published Tin-glaze Pottery which gives a history of maiolica, delftware and faience in Europe and the Islamic world. A selection of tin glaze pottery by contemporary Studio potters is given Tin-glazed Earthenware by Daphne Carnegy.

The pottery Royal Tichelaar Makkum, located in Makkum, Friesland, continue the production of Delftware using tin-glazed earthenware.

== Gallery of modern examples ==
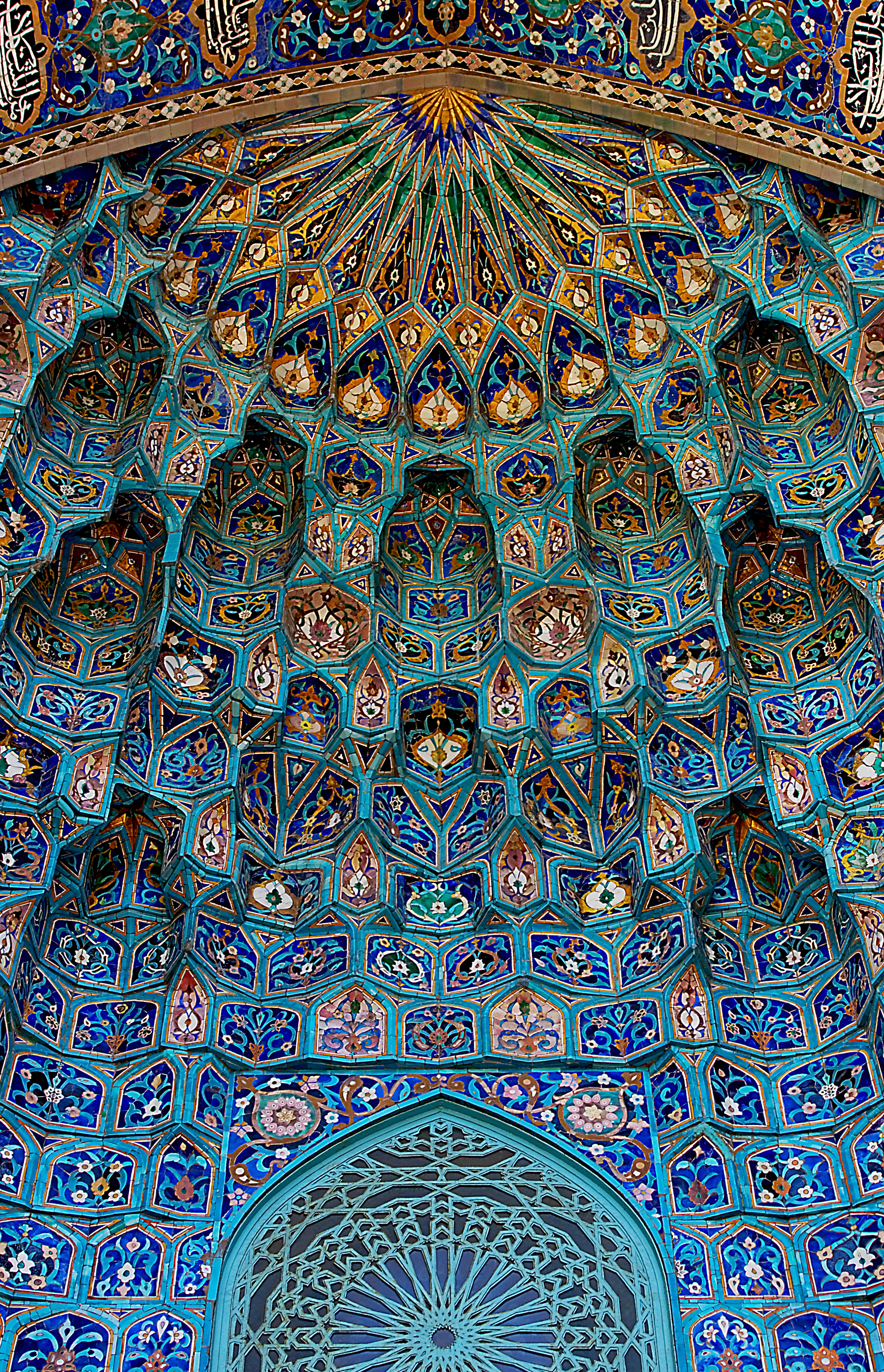
Maiolica of portal, in the form of Muqarnas, Saint Petersburg Mosque

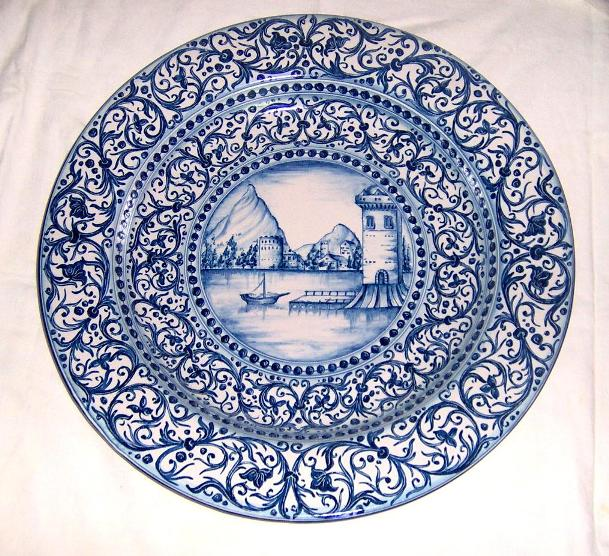
A modern plate from Caltagirone, Sicily, painted in cobalt blue

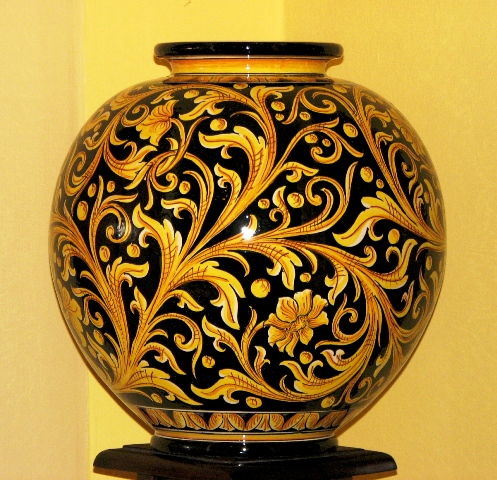
A modern vase from Caltagirone, Sicily

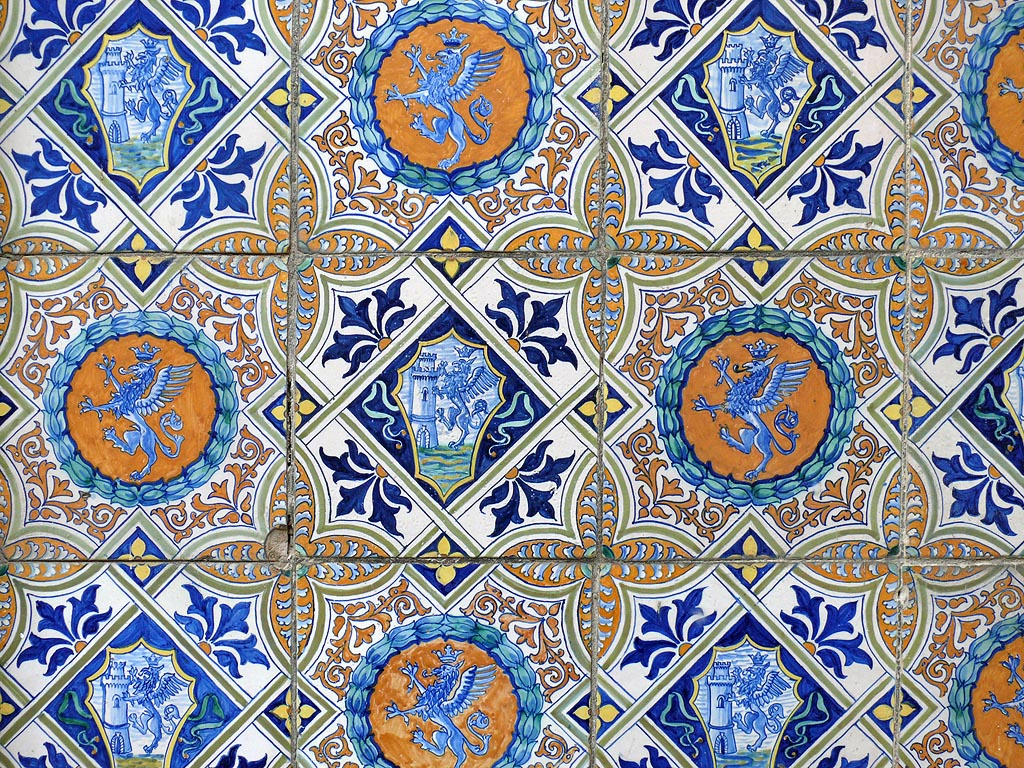
Modern tiles from Deruta

== See also ==
- Azulejo
- Faience
- Islamic pottery
- Lusterware
- Lead-glazed earthenware
- Tin glaze
