= Flower brick =

A flower brick is a type of vase, cuboid-shaped like a building brick, and designed to be seen with the long face towards the viewer.

Traditional flower bricks are made of a ceramic material, usually delftware or other tin-glazed earthenware. The top surface has a large hole into which water is poured, and a number of smaller holes into which flower stems are inserted, so that the flowers are kept in position. These vessels are a sub-type of the boughpot or tulipiere, which have more rounded shapes. Flower bricks are thought to have been the most common vessel for flowers besides vases in the 18th century.

Some scholars suggest that flower bricks may have been used as quill holders and inkwells during the 17th century, although this is debated. There are few surviving pictorial representations of these objects in use during the 17th or 18th century.

== Examples ==
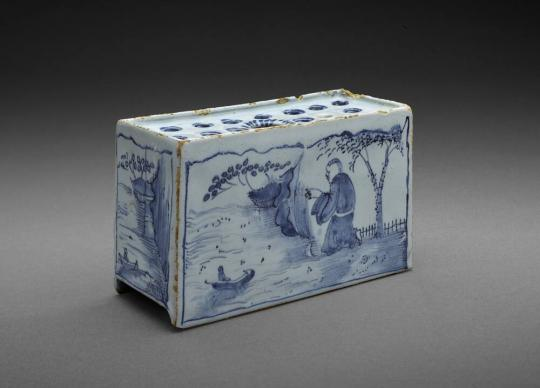
English flower brick, c.1750-1760, by unknown maker. Tin-glazed earthenware (delftware), 3 1/2 × 2 3/8 × 5 1/2 in. (8.9 × 6 × 14 cm). Museum of Fine Arts, Houston.

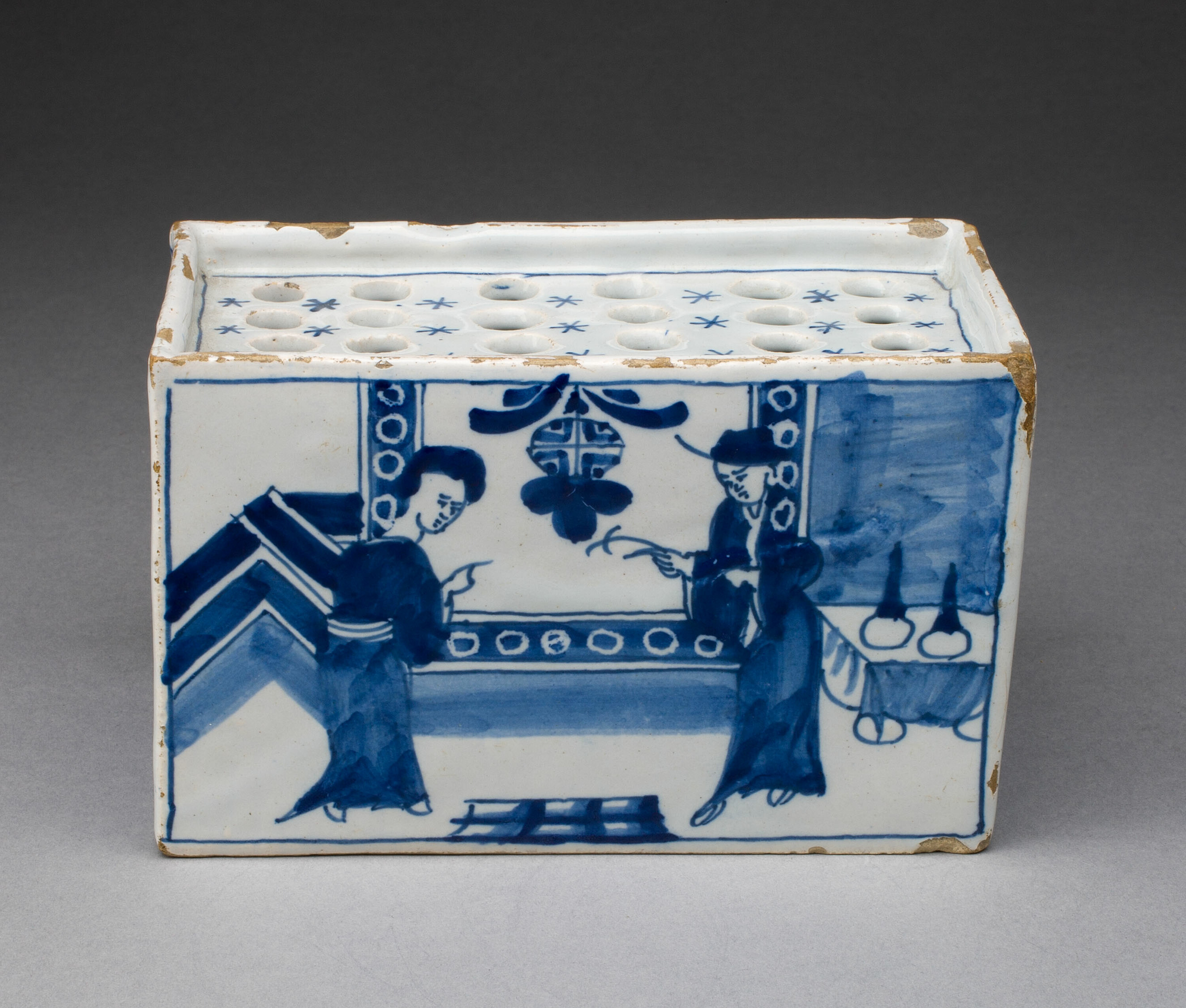
Flower brick (c. 1750), London. Tin-glazed earthenware, 14.6 × 9.2 × 7.3 cm (5 3/4 × 3 5/8 × 2 7/8 in.). Art Institute of Chicago.

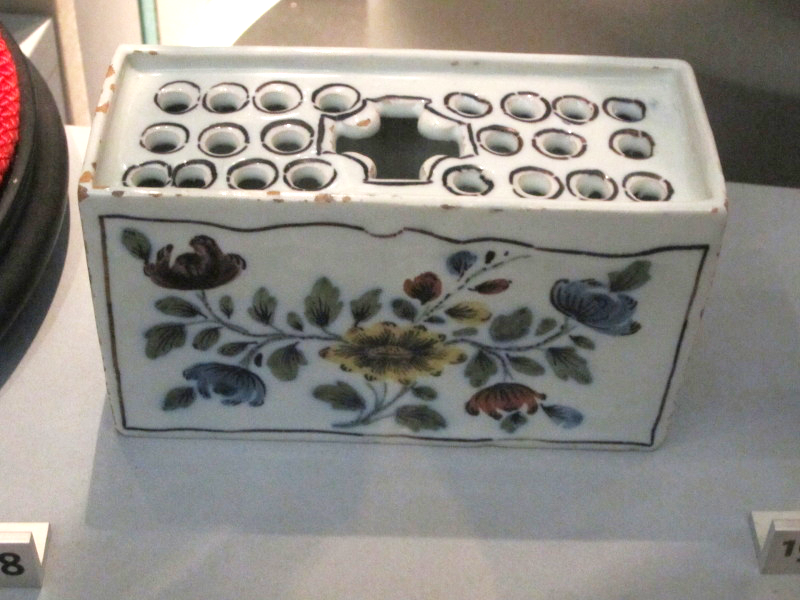
Flower brick, Liverpool, England. Tin-glazed earthenware, made in Liverpool around 1760. Walker Art Gallery.
