= Abū Zayd ibn Muḥammad ibn Abī Zayd =

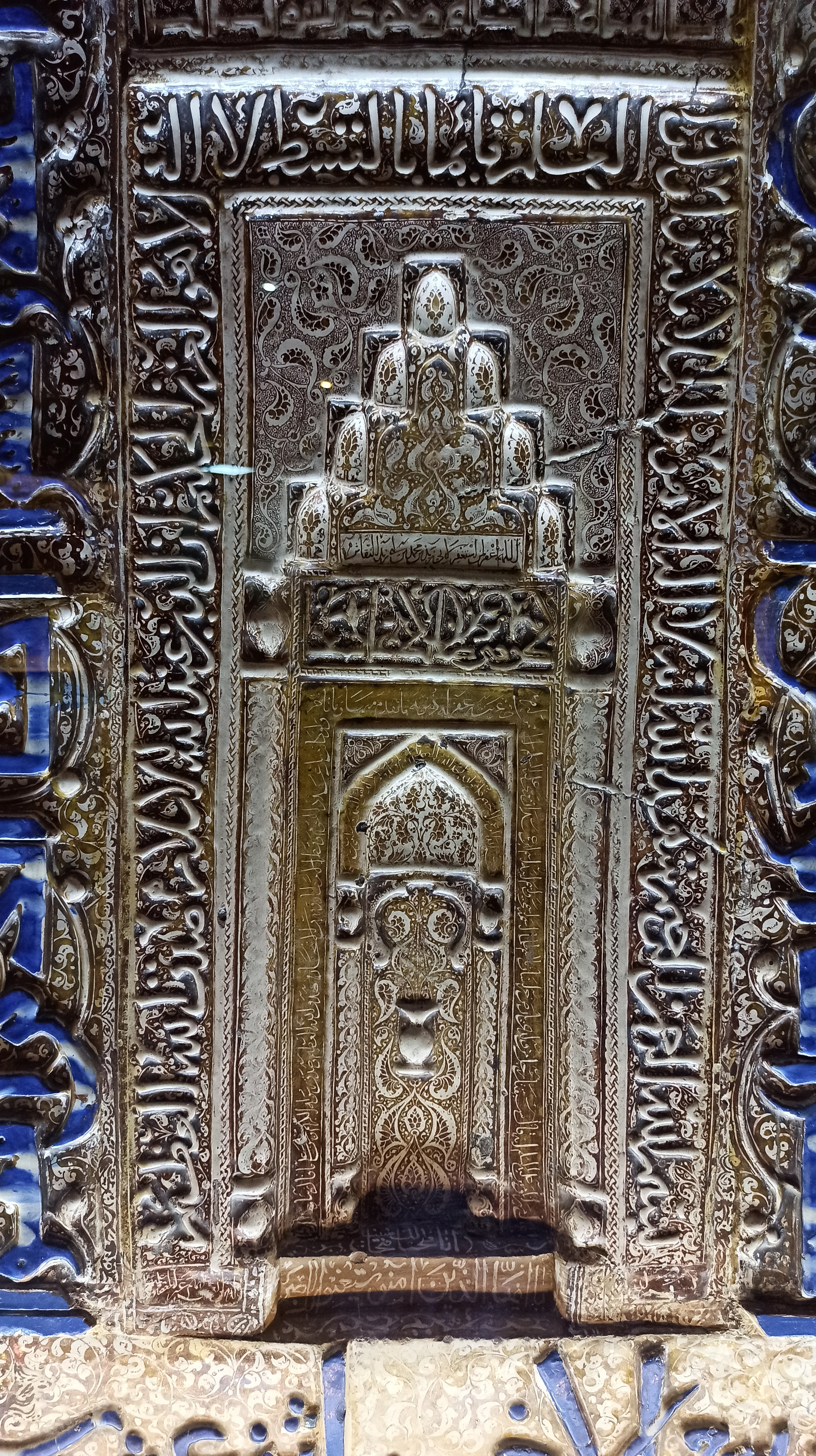
Luster mihrab from the tomb of Imam Reza (see Imam Reza shrine), dated 612 AH (1215-1216 CE). Astan Quds Razavi Museum.

Abū Zayd ibn Muḥammad ibn Abī Zayd (Persian: سید شمس‌الدین بن محمد بن أبی زید حسنی کاشانی; fl. 1186–1219 in Kashan), commonly referred to as Abu Zayd or Abu Zayd Kashani (ابو زید کاشانی), is the most famous potter of medieval Iran, who worked in the two most expensive overglaze techniques, enamel (mina'i) and luster, and left behind the greatest number of signed works.

At least 15 tiles and vessels signed by Abu Zayd are known, dated from 26 March 1186 to 1219. The earliest known work by Abu Zayd is an enameled bowl in the Metropolitan Museum of Art (see illustration), one of the first examples of mina'i ware, so the group has been assigned to him. Despite this fact Abu Zayd is best known for his lustrewares. As Oliver Watson has pointed out, enameled bowl from 1186 is too accomplished to have been a first work, and Abu Zayd must have made earlier objects that we do not know about. Watson discerned the three styles of painting used to decorate Kashan lustreware - "monumental", most indebted to works produced earlier in Egypt and Syria, "miniature", and "Kashan". Enameled bowl from 1186 is in miniature style, clearly inspired by book painting. It seems that Abu Zayd was a key figure in the development of the miniature style in the 1180s, as he was responsible for a group of enameled bowls dated 1186 and 1187 (see illustrations), as well as a fragmentary luster vase dated 1191.

These two styles were then replaced by the Kashan style, designed expressly to show off the luster technique to its best advantage. The first dated example of the Kashan style is dated September 1199 and from this time onwards, all dated lustrewares are in the Kashan style, including several works signed by Abu Zayd, who is credited with developing of this new manner of decoration. Perhaps the most famous work in the Kashan style is a large scalloped plate dated December 1210 in the Freer Gallery of Art (see illustration). It was the subject of article by Richard Ettinghausen, who with Grace Guest analyzed the unusually complex iconography of a horse and seven figures - five of them standing, one seated, and one floating in a fishpond in the lower exergue. According to Oliver Watson, the most important of Abu Zayd's surviving work consists of tilling. His most important projects, carried out with another potter from Kashan, Muhammad ibn Abi Tahir (see Abu Taher (family)), were the decorations added to the tomb chambers in the shrines of Fatima at Qum and Imam Reza in Mashad. In the shrines his signature appears on frieze tiles, star tiles, and, at Mashhad, a large mihrab (see illustration), which "is his finest work, showing the highest quality of calligraphy, molded arabesques, and painted scrolling".

Abu Zayd's signatures tell us that he came from an important family of Hasani sayyids in Kashan. He was careful to specify that he both made (ʻamila) and decorated (șanaʻa) the work, "thus distinguishing potting from painting and telling us that he did both". He was not only a potter and painter but also a poet and scribe, because sometimes he inscribed on vessels his own verses. In most cases, however, Abu Zayd, like other potters working in Kashan, transcribed verses by other poets. Abu Zayd's signature on pieces in the two most important techniques of overglaze luxury ceramics "is one of the main reasons that enamelled ware, like lustreware, can be attributed to Kashan".

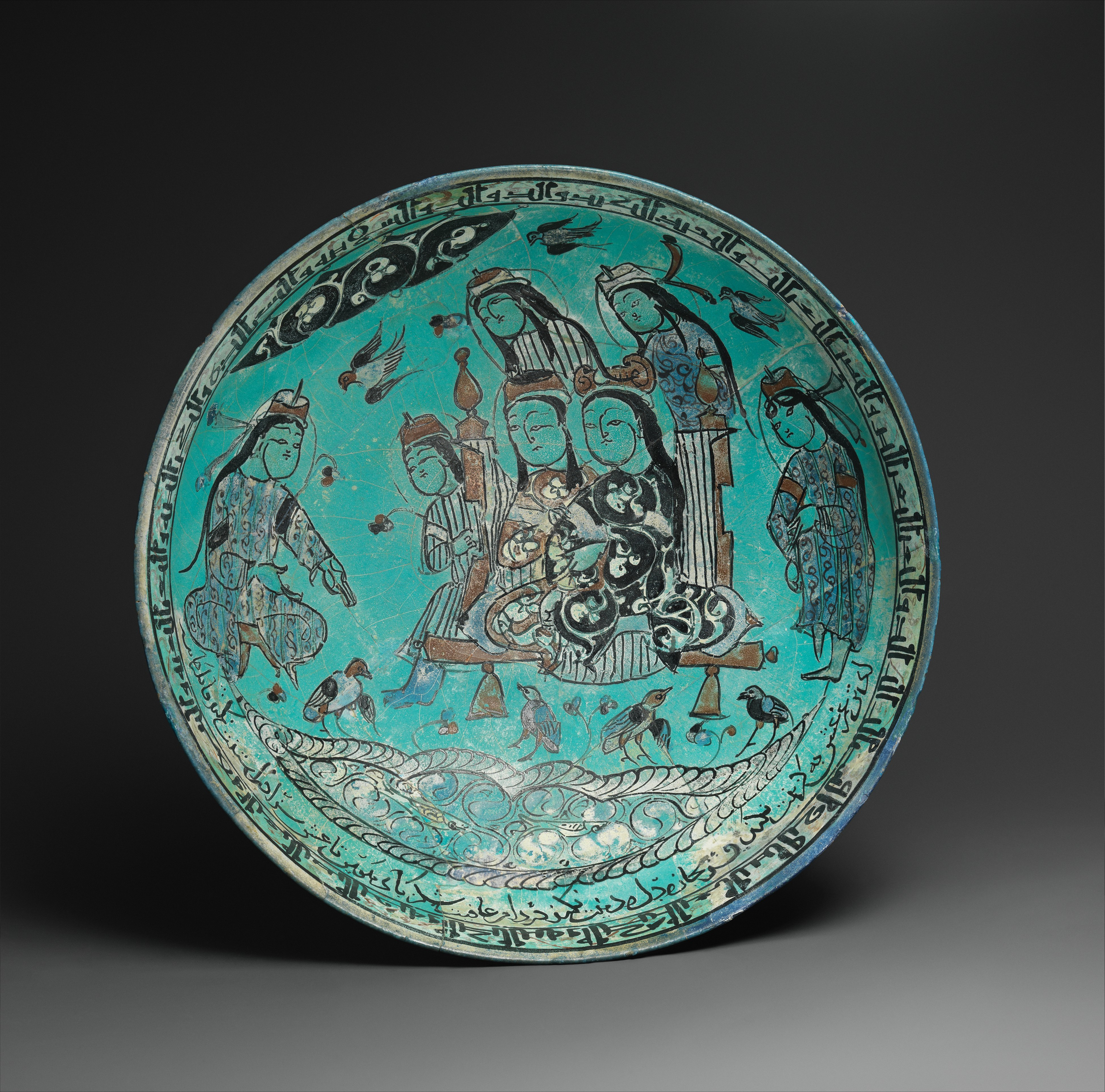
Mina'i bowl dated 4 Muharram 582 (27 March 1186) Metropolitan Museum of Art.

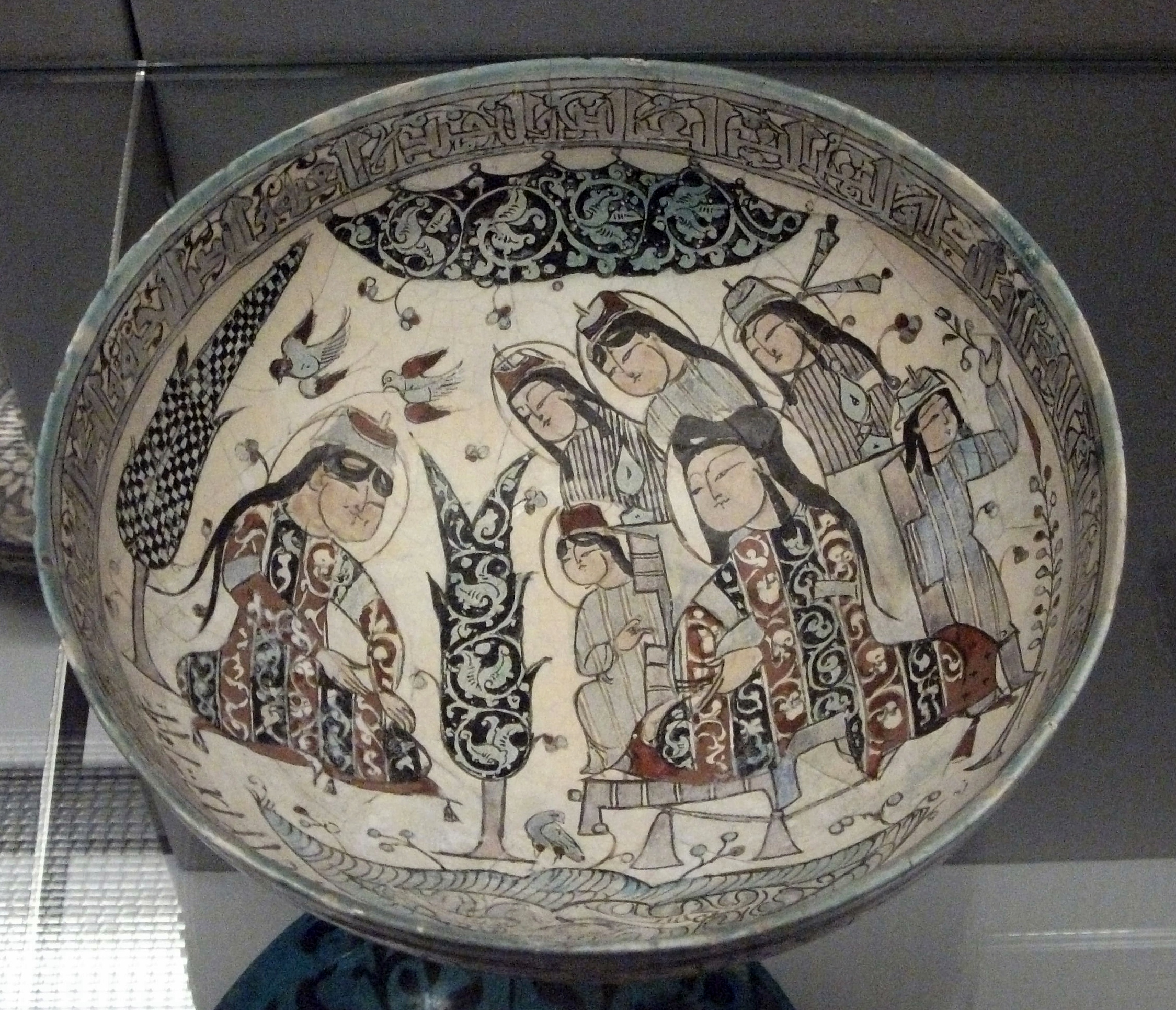
Mina'i bowl dated Muharram 583 (March-April 1187). British Museum.

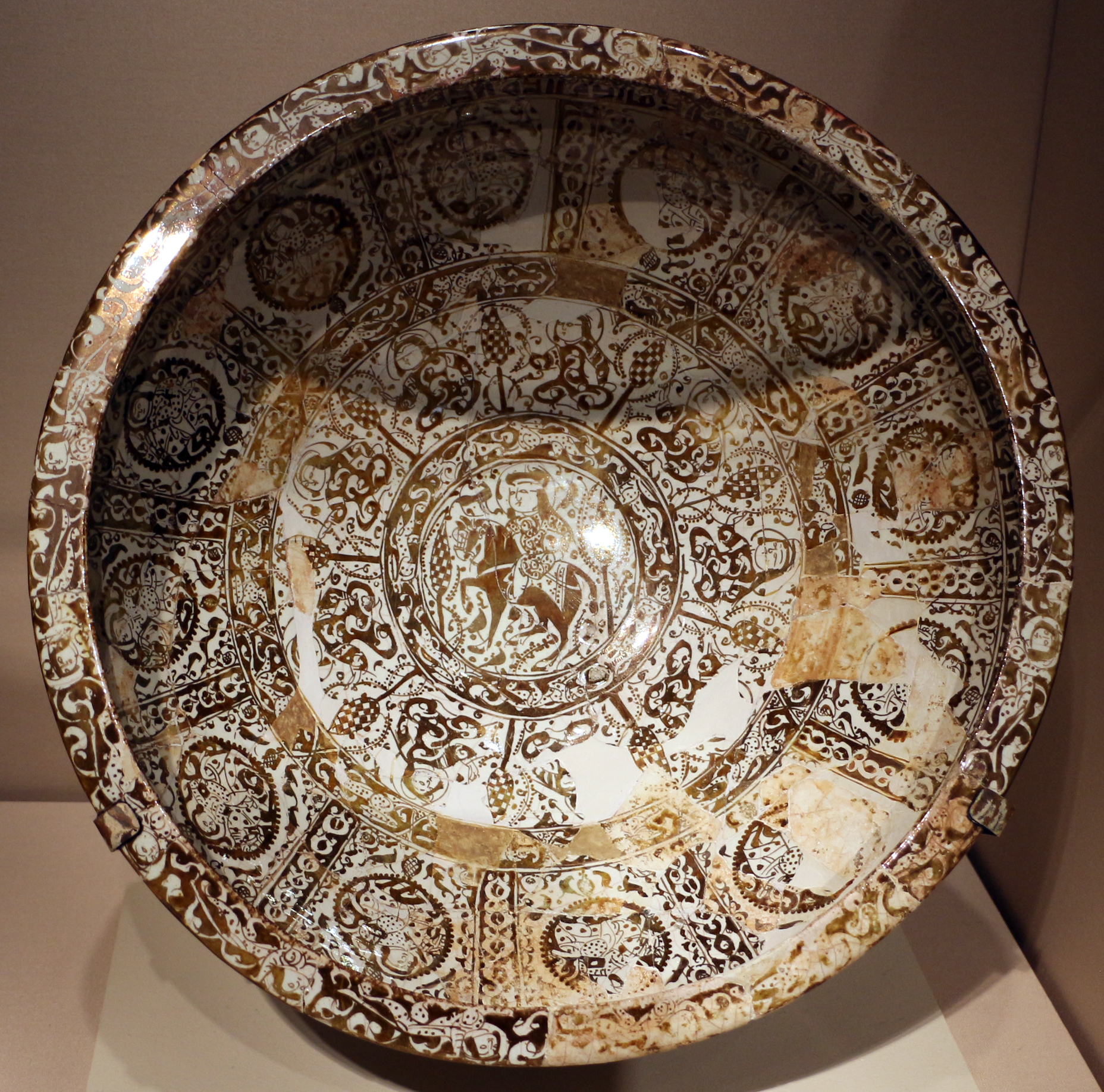
Large luster bowl dated Safar 587 (February-March 1191). Art Institute of Chicago.

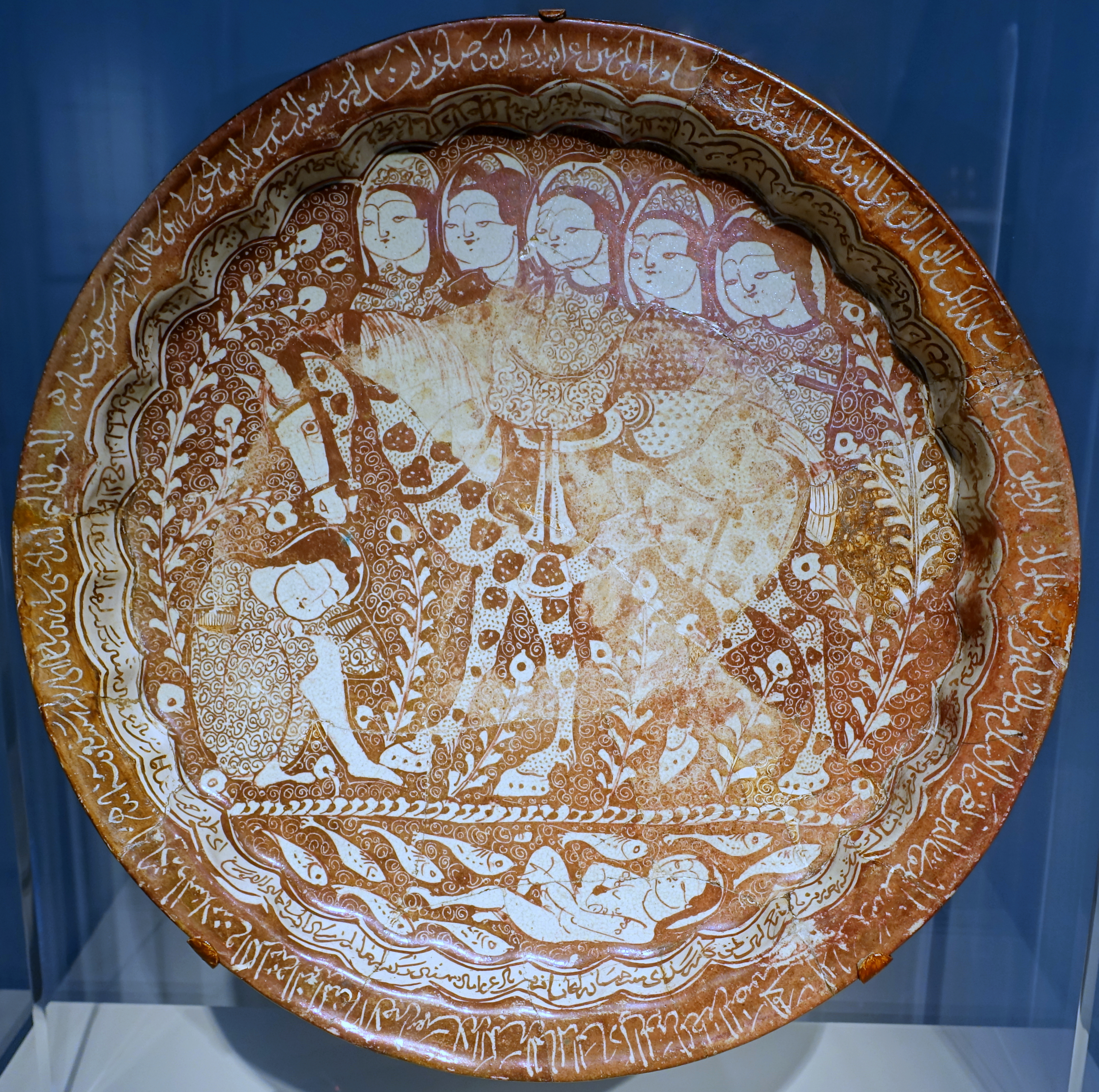
Luster scalloped plate dated Jumada II 607 (December 1210). Freer Gallery of Art.

== Bibliography ==
- Blair, Sheila S. (2008). "A BRIEF BIOGRAPHY OF ABU ZAYD". Muqarnas. 25: 155–176. JSTOR 27811118.
