= Abu Taher (family) =

Persian family of potters

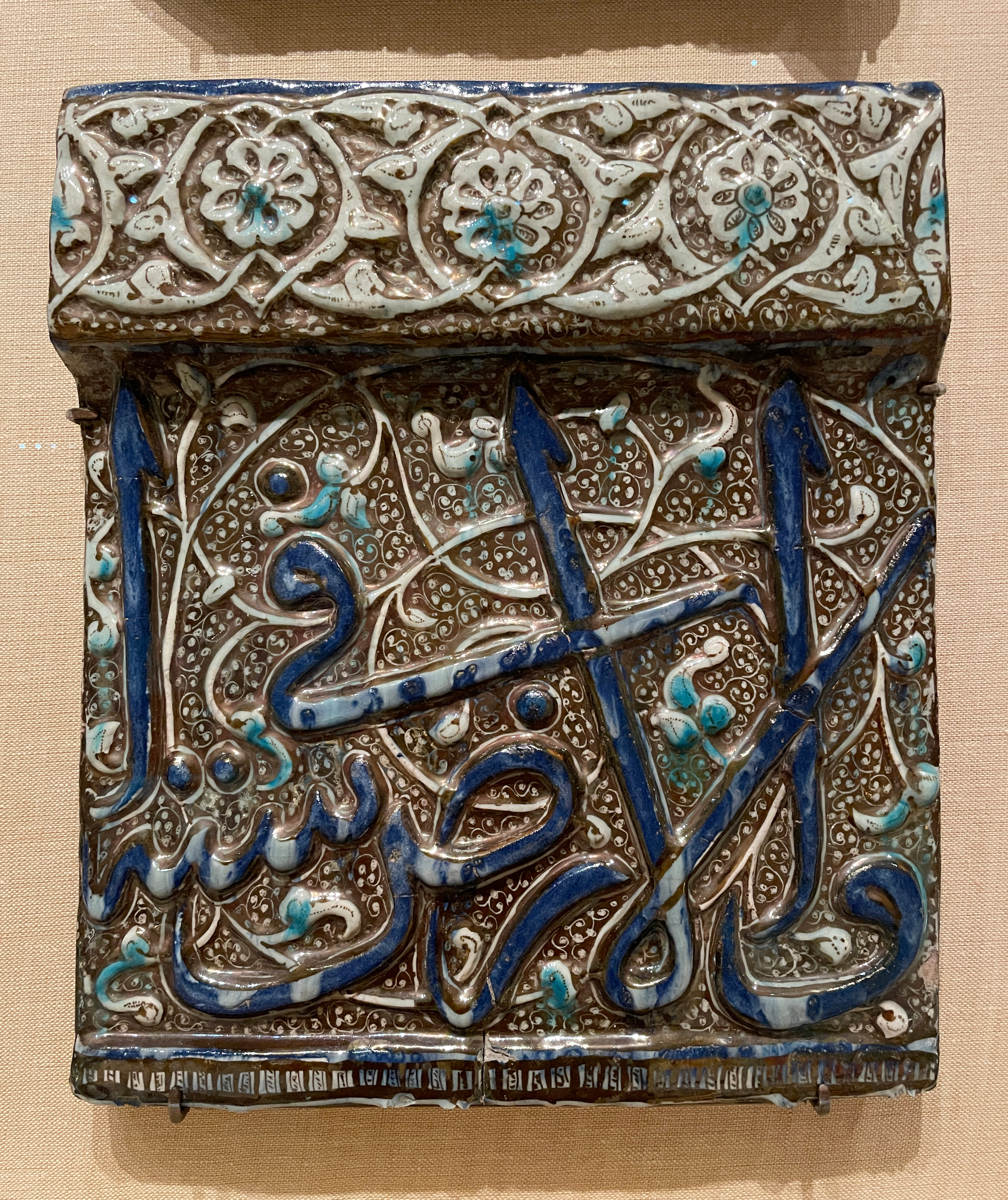
Decorative tile from an inscriptional frieze which once adorned the tomb complex of Ali Ibn Ja'afar in Qom, dated 1334 (AH 734) and bearing the signature of Yūsof; inscribed: "and the earth, in six d[ays]" – Qur'an 7:54.

The Persian Abū Ṭāher family of Kāšān produced four generations of potters active between 1205 and 1333 (AH 602–734) whose signatures appear on surviving works, especially the tiled meḥrābs of mosques.

== Members ==
1. Bū Ṭāher Ḥosayn, known through a single mīnāʾī ware bowl which bears his name and is dated to the late 12th century on stylistic grounds;
2. Moḥammad ibn Abī Ṭāher (fl. 1205–1215), collaborated with Abū Zayd ibn Moḥammad ibn Abī Zayd in tiling parts of the shrine of Fāṭema at Qom and the shrine of Imam Reżā at Mašhad;
3. ʿAlī (fl. 1242), Moḥammad's son;
4. Yūsof (fl. 1305–1334), ʿAlī's son;
5. Abu'l-Qāsem (fl. 1303–1325), Yūsof's brother, a historian under the Mongol Il-khan Olǰāytū; his ʿArāʾes al-ǰawāher wa nafāʾes al-aṭāʾeb includes a short study of the science of ceramics.

== See also ==
- Islamic geometric patterns

== Sources ==
- Watson, O. (21 July 2011) [1983]. "Abū Ṭāher". Encyclopædia Iranica. Vol. I/4 (online ed.). pp. 385–7.
- "Tile from an Inscriptional Frieze, dated 734 AH/1334 CE". The Metropolitan Museum of Art.
