= Tarikh-e Oljaytu =

- Author: Abu al-Qasim Kashani
- Original title: تاریخ اولجایتو
- Language: Persian
- Subject: Reign of Öljaitü
- Genre: Chronicle

Tarikh-e Oljaytu (Persian: تاریخ اولجایتو, "History of Öljaitü") is a Persian chronicle by the Iranian historian Abu al-Qasim Kashani, devoted to the reign of the Ilkhanid ruler Öljaitü (r. 1304–1316). The work covers Öljaitü's reign until his death on 13 December 1316 and is an important narrative source for the political history of the late Ilkhanate.

== Contents ==
The chronicle records political and court events during Öljaitü's reign and appears to have drawn in part on Kashani's day-to-day records of court activities. It contains a particularly detailed account of the rivalry between the viziers Rashid al-Din Hamadani and Taj al-Din Ali Shah. Kashani strongly favours Ali Shah and is openly hostile towards Rashid al-Din, a bias that has to be taken into account when using the work as a historical source.

The Tarikh-e Oljaytu is also significant for the history of the Jami' al-tawarikh. Kashani claimed that he had written part of the material that Rashid al-Din presented to Öljaitü as his own work, and stated that his chronicle was intended to provide a fuller account of the reign. Modern scholarship generally regards Rashid al-Din as the principal author of the Jami' al-tawarikh, while recognising that he employed a number of collaborators, among whom Kashani was probably included.

== Manuscripts and edition ==
The precise date of composition of the work is uncertain. The earliest known surviving manuscript is dated 29 Rabi' II 725 AH (14 April 1325). A critical edition of the Persian text, edited by Mahin Hambly, was published in Tehran in 1969. The chronicle subsequently served as a source for later Persian historians; for example, Abu Bakr Qutbi Ahari drew on it for events of the early 14th century in his Tarikh-e Shaykh Uways.
