= Abu al-Qasim Kashani =

Persian historian

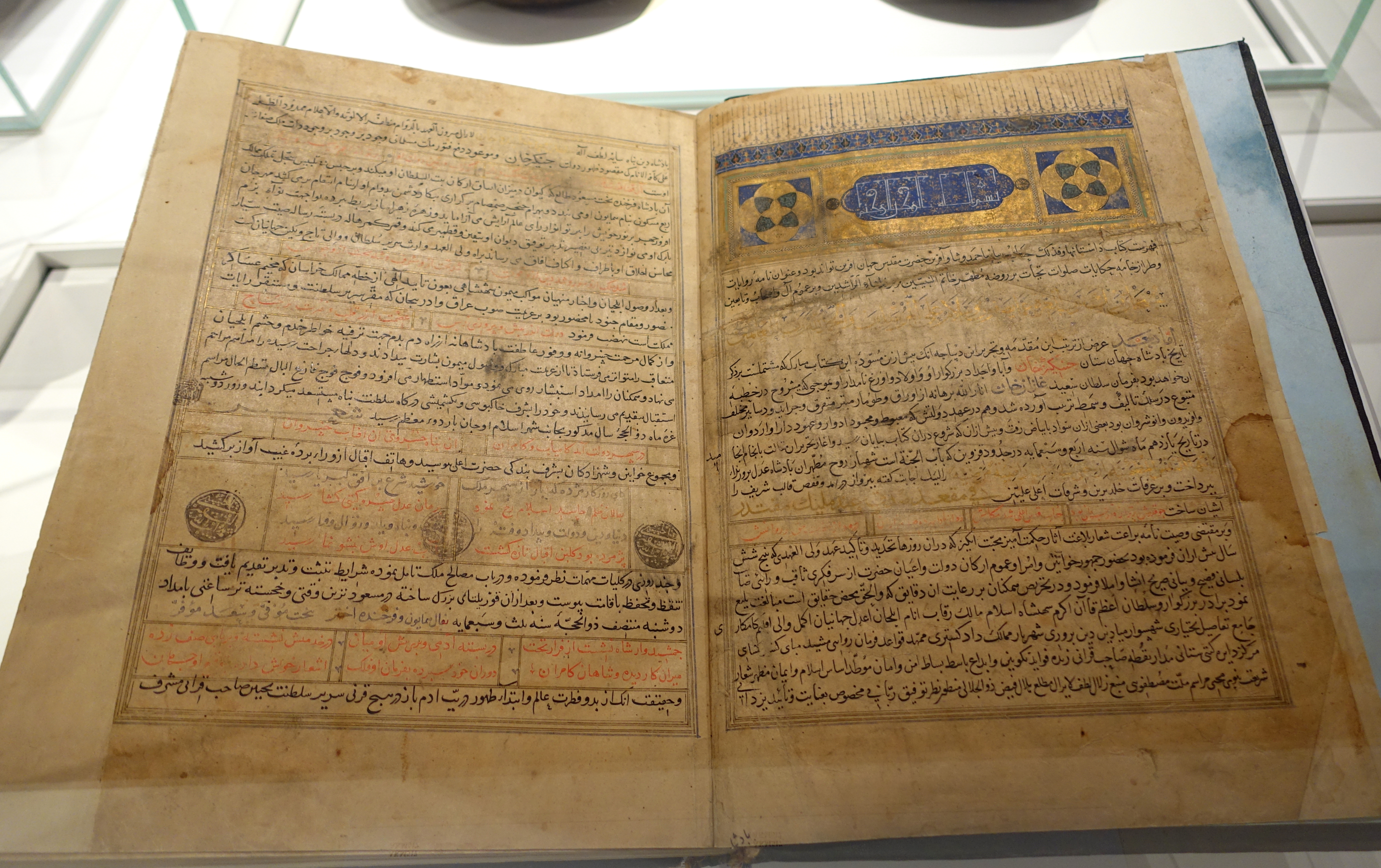
15th-century manuscript of the historical work Jami' al-tawarikh of Rashid al-Din Hamadani, which Kashani helped write

Abu al-Qasem Kashani (Persian: ابوالقاسم کاشانی; died after 1324) was a Persian historian from the Abu Taher family, who was active during the late Ilkhanate era. He is notable for claiming that the vizier of the Ilkhanate, Rashid al-Din Hamadani, had stolen credit for the historical work Jami' al-tawarikh. Although modern scholarship regards Rashid al-Din as the overall author of the work, he is generally considered to have been aided by several assistants, including Kashani.

Kashani's major work is Tarikh-e Oljaytu (History of Öljaitü), covering Öljaitü's reign until his death in 1316. It is there that Kashani makes his allegations against Rashid al-Din. Since Rashid al-Din's account of this ruler in Jami' al-tawarikh is missing, whereas Kashani's work is complete, this gives some credibility to Kashani's claims.

== List of works ==
1. Zobdat al-tawārīḵ (Note: Also transliterated as Zubdat al-tawārīkh.) ('The Quintessence of History'), 1303, dedicated to the Il-khan, a history of the Islamic world down to the siege of Baghdad; mostly unpublished.
2. Tārīḵ-e Olǰāytū, 1325, an account of the Il-khan's reign.
3. ʿArāʾes al-ǰawāher wa nafāʾes al-aṭāʾeb, a work on mineralogy, gemmology and perfumery, to which is appended a short treatise on ceramics.

== Editions ==
- Tarikh-e Oljaytu, ed. Mahin Hambly, Tehran 1969

== Sources ==
- Afshar, Iraj (2003). "Persian Historiography from the Īlkhānid Period to the Vigilance and Renaissance Eras". In İhsanoğlu, Ekmeleddin (ed.). Culture and Learning in Islam. The Different Aspects of Islamic Culture 5. UNESCO Publishing. p. 514. ISBN 978-92-3-103909-6.
- Melville, Charles (2008). "Jāmeʿ al-tawāriḵ I. The work". In Yarshater, Ehsan (ed.). Encyclopædia Iranica (Online ed.). Encyclopædia Iranica Foundation.
- Davud, Seyyed Ali Al-i; Nazerian, Amir Hushang (2008). "Abū al-Qāsim Kāshānī". In Madelung, Wilferd; Daftary, Farhad (eds.). Encyclopaedia Islamica Online. Brill Online. ISSN 1875-9831.
- Jackson, Peter (2017). The Mongols and the Islamic World: From Conquest to Conversion. Yale University Press. pp. 1–448. ISBN 9780300227284. JSTOR 10.3366/j.ctt1n2tvq0. (registration required)
- Jones, Tobias (2021). "The Objects of Loyalty in the Early Mongol Empire (Twelfth and Thirteenth Centuries)". Iran. 61 (2): 196–220. doi:10.1080/05786967.2021.1915701. hdl:1887/3731983.
- Hope, Michael (2016). Power, Politics, and Tradition in the Mongol Empire and the Īlkhānate of Iran. Oxford University Press. ISBN 978-0198768593.
- Soucek, P. P. (1983). "Abu'l-Qāsem ʿAbdallāh Kāshānī". In Yarshater, Ehsan (ed.). Encyclopædia Iranica. Vol. I/4: Abū Manṣūr Heravı̄–Adat. London and New York: Routledge & Kegan Paul. pp. 362–363. ISBN 978-0-71009-093-5.
