= Zubdat al-Tawarikh (Kashani) =

- Author: Abu al-Qasim Kashani
- Original title: زبدة التواریخ
- Language: Persian
- Subject: World history
- Genre: Chronicle

Zubdat al-Tawarikh (Persian: زبدة التواریخ, "The Quintessence of Histories") is a Persian historical work by the early 14th-century Iranian historian Abu al-Qasim Kashani. It is a general or universal history composed during the Ilkhanid period. In its surviving form, the work was associated with the court of Öljaitü, although recent research suggests that an earlier form of Kashani's world history had already been produced during the reign of Ghazan.

== Contents and transmission ==
Earlier scholarship described the Zubdat al-Tawarikh primarily as a history of the Islamic world extending to the fall of Baghdad in 1258. Only portions of the work were known to have survived, and for much of the 20th century its overall structure remained uncertain.

More recent study of surviving manuscripts has substantially expanded understanding of the work. Osamu Otsuka identified Kashani's Zubdat al-Tawarikh as a broader Persian world history, containing accounts of pre-Islamic and Islamic history as well as sections on non-Islamic peoples and regions. Research by Stefan Kamola has further argued that substantial portions of Kashani's history were incorporated into Rashid al-Din Hamadani's Jami' al-tawarikh. According to this interpretation, Kashani's work is important for reconstructing the composition and textual development of Rashid al-Din's celebrated world history.

A particularly important surviving section concerns the history of the Fatimids and the Nizari Ismailis. Kashani's account is one of the Persian sources for the history of the Ismailis following the Mongol destruction of Alamut in 1256, although its narrative is closely related to that found in Rashid al-Din's historical works.

== Modern edition ==
The section dealing with the Fatimids and Nizari Ismailis was edited by Mohammad Taqi Daneshpajouh and published separately as Zubdat al-Tawarikh: Bakhsh-e Fatemiyan va Nizariyan. A second edition appeared in Tehran in 1987. Much of the complete work, however, has never been published in a modern critical edition.

== See also ==
- Abu al-Qasim Kashani
- Jami' al-tawarikh
- Rashid al-Din Hamadani
