= Mina'i ware =

Type of Persian pottery

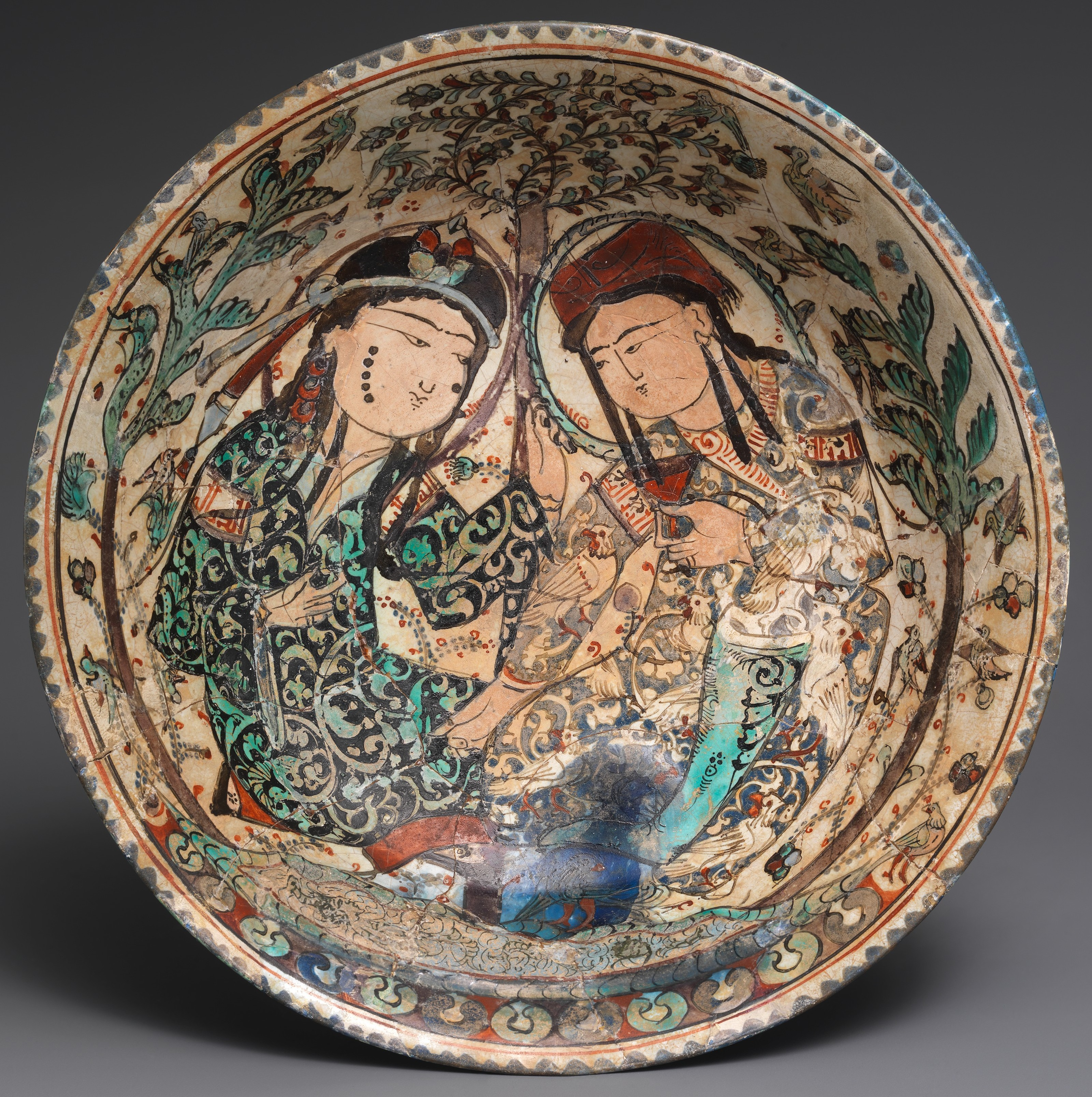
Bowl with couple in a garden, around 1200. In this type of scene, the figures are larger than in other common subjects. Diameter 18.8 cm.

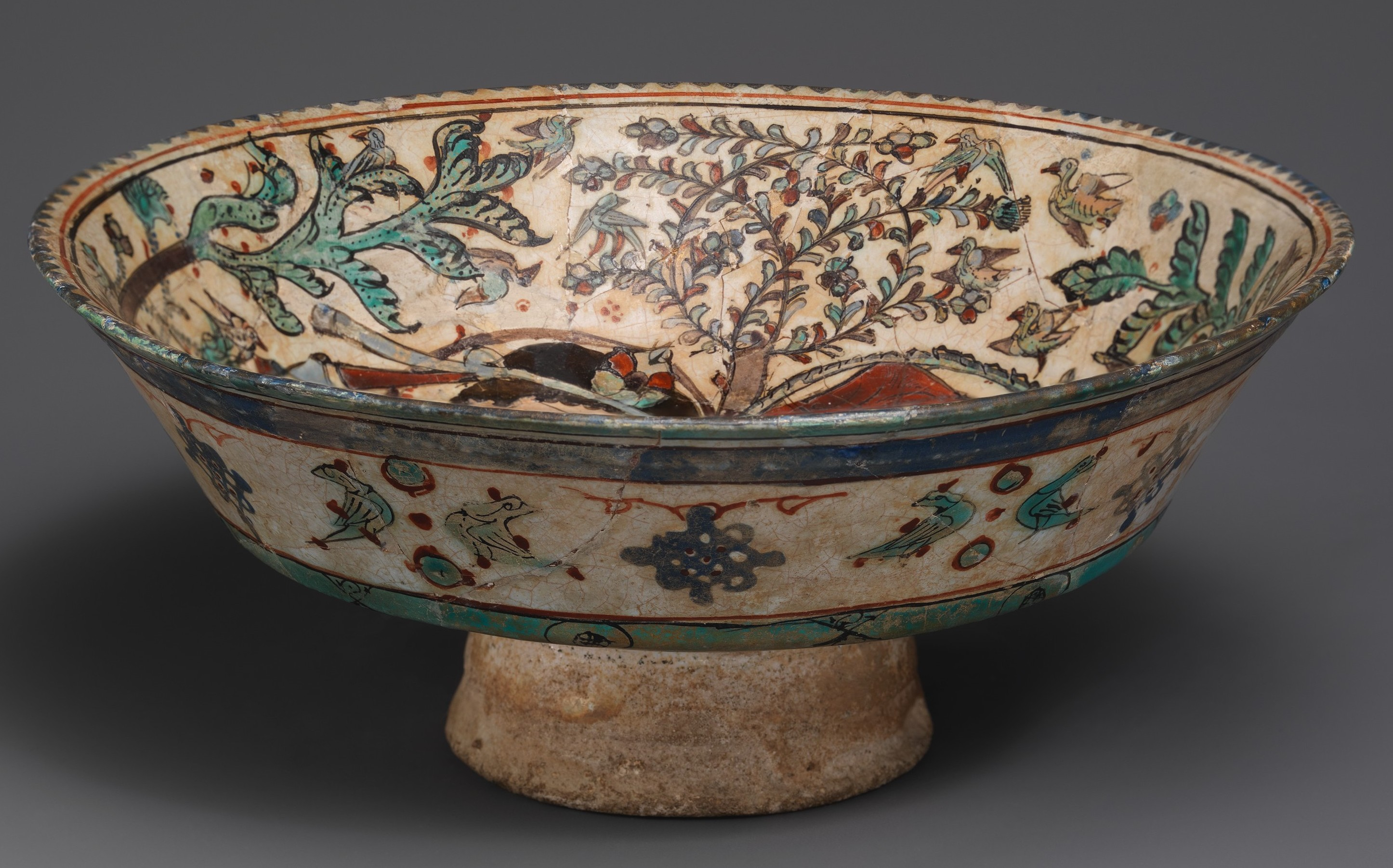
Side view of the same bowl

Mina'i ware (Persian: سفال مینایی) is a type of Persian pottery developed in Kashan in the decades leading up to the Mongol invasion of Persia and Mesopotamia in 1219, after which production ceased. It has been described as "probably the most luxurious of all types of ceramic ware produced in the eastern lands during the medieval period". The ceramic body of white-ish fritware or stonepaste is fully decorated with detailed paintings using several colours, usually including figures.

It is significant as the first pottery to use overglaze enamels, painted over the ceramic glaze fixed by a main glost firing; after painting the wares were given a second firing at a lower temperature. "Mina'i" (Persian: مینایی), a term only used for these wares much later, means "enamelled" in the Persian language. The technique is also known as haft-rang, "seven colours" in Persian. This term was used by the near-contemporary writer Abu al-Qasim Kasani, who had a pottery background. This technique much later became the standard method of decorating the best European and Chinese porcelain, though it is not clear that there was a connection between this and the earlier Persian use of the technique. As in other periods and regions when overglaze enamels were used, the purpose of the technique was to expand the range of colours available to painters beyond the very limited group that could withstand the temperature required for the main firing of the body and glaze, which in the case of these wares was about 950 °C.

The period also introduced underglaze decoration to Persian pottery, around 1200, and later mina'i pieces often combine both underglaze and overglaze decoration; the former may also be described as inglaze. Most pieces are dated imprecisely as, for example, "late 12th or early 13th century", but the few inscribed dates begin in the 1170s and end in 1219. Gilded pieces are often dated to around or after 1200. It is assumed that the style and subjects in the painting of mina'i ware were drawn from contemporary Persian manuscript paintings and wall paintings. It is known these existed, but no illustrated manuscripts or murals from the period before the Mongol conquest have survived, leaving the painting on the pottery as the best evidence of that style.

Most pieces are bowls, cups, and a range of pouring vessels: ewers, jars, and jugs, but only a handful are huge. Some pieces are considered begging bowls, or using the shape associated with that function. Tiles are rare, perhaps designed as centrepieces surrounded by other materials, rather than placed in groups. Mina'i tiles found in situ by archaeologists at Konya, Turkey were probably made there by itinerant Persian artists. Sherds of mina'i ware have been excavated from "most urban sites in Iran and Central Asia" occupied during the period, although most writers believe that nearly all production was in Kashan.

== Wares and dates ==
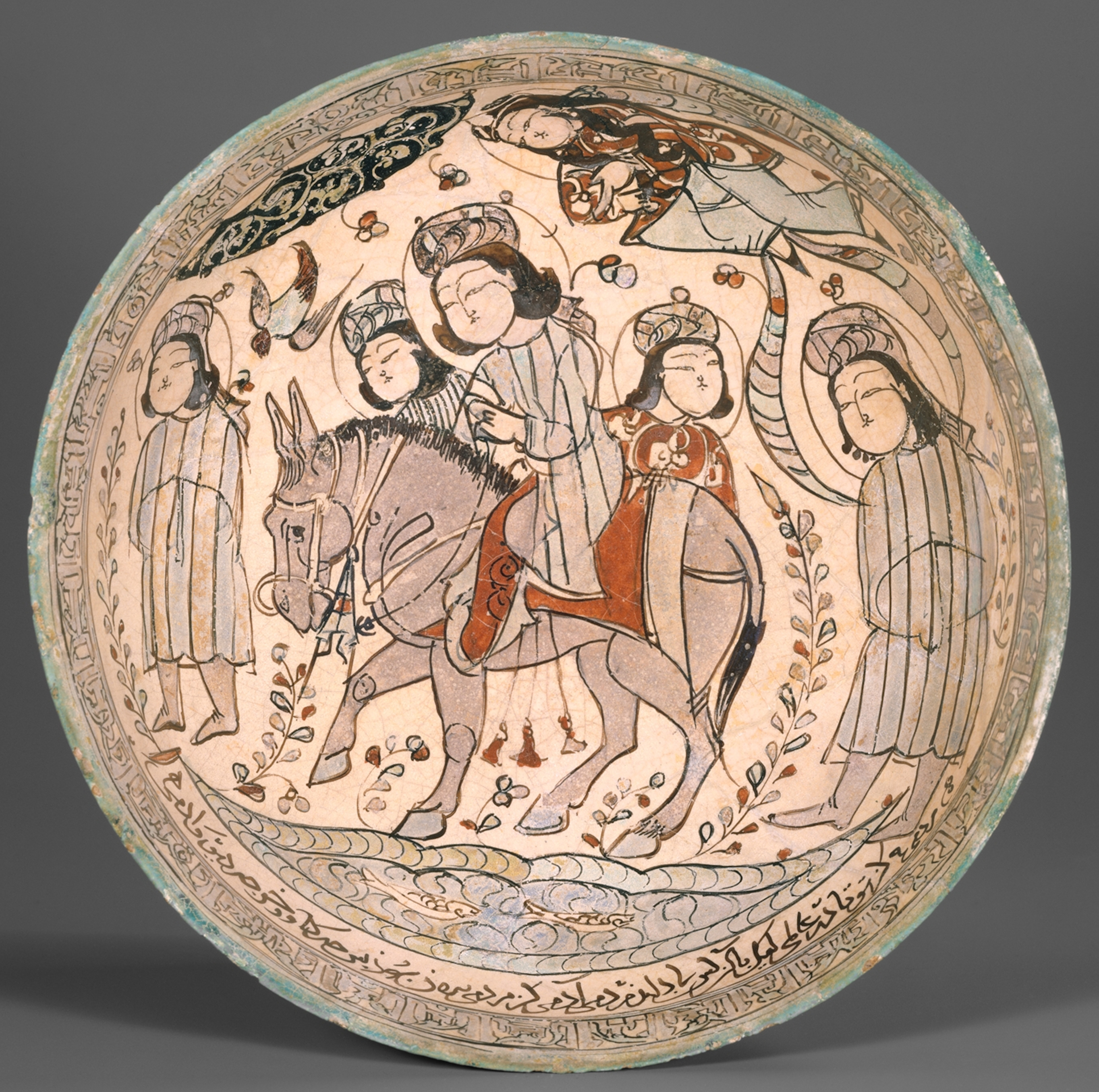
The earliest Mina'i bowl dated and signed by Abu Zayd al-Kashani in 1187 CE, just a few years before the fall of the Seljuk Empire in 1194. Iran.

Black and cobalt blue may be in underglaze, with a wider range of colours in overglaze. As well as the usual white glaze, a coloured turquoise glaze is used in some pieces, giving a background to the overglaze painting. The designs' outlines were black, with thin brushed lines. Some mina'i pieces, usually thought to be from the later part of the period, use gilding, sometimes on patterns on the body that are raised up (probably using slip). A few pieces combine lustre and mina'i painting in different zones.

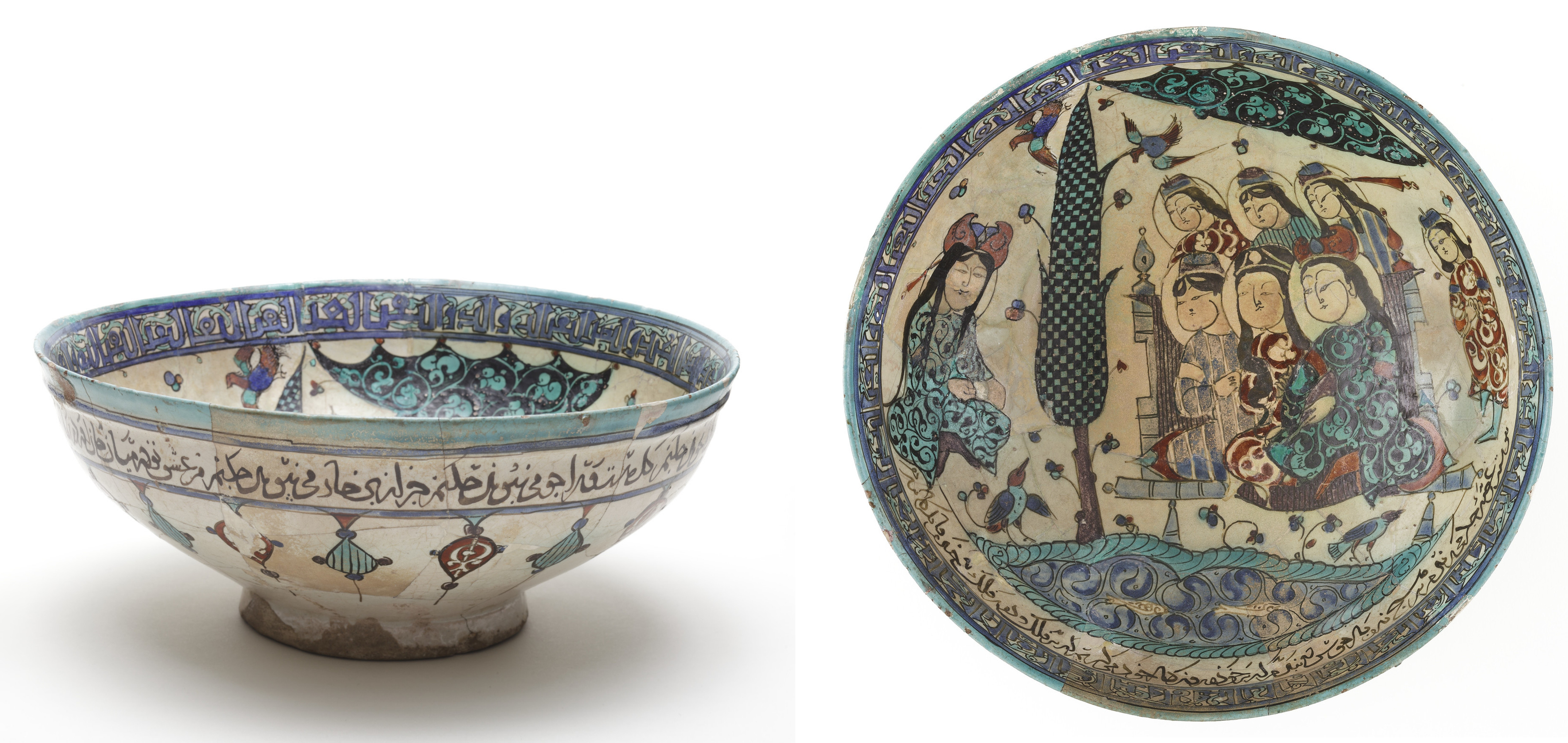
A Mina'i bowl, dated 1187 CE, a few years before the end of the Seljuk Empire in 1194. Scene of poetic recitation, with poetic verses inscribed on the rim: "If the beloved leaves me, what am I to do? If s/he does not see the wisdom of our union, what am I to do?". Kashan, Iran. Los Angeles County Museum of Art.

A small proportion (smaller than for lustreware) of pieces are signed and dated. Watson records ten such pieces, signed by three potters, with dates from 1178 to 1219. For Kashan lustreware the equivalent numbers are "over ninety" pieces, "perhaps six" potters, and dates from 1178 and 1226; there are then no dated pieces until 1261, suggesting the long-lasting disruption of the Mongol invasion.

Abū Zayd ibn Muḥammad ibn Abī Zayd, a Kashani potter in this period, demonstrated that the same workshop might produce the two techniques with the most signed pieces, with fifteen pieces. The earliest date on these is 1187, on a mina'i bowl, but most pieces are lustreware, where dates extend to 1219.

In the Ilkhanate, overglaze painting continued in a rare new style called lajvardina wares, but these featured patterns rather than figures, with deep underglaze blue and gold leaf fixed in a second firing. The Persian name refers to lapis lazuli, though the usual cobalt blue was used.,

The study of mina'i ware is complicated by a lot of excessive restoration and embellishment by dealers after the pieces attracted the attention of collectors, mostly in the West, from the late 19th century onwards. For example, the catalogue entry for a bowl in the Metropolitan Museum of Art, from the Robert Lehman collection, records that "Extensive restoration has interfered with the inscription in certain areas, and nearly every part of the interior decoration has been subjected to heavy overpainting".

== Iconography ==
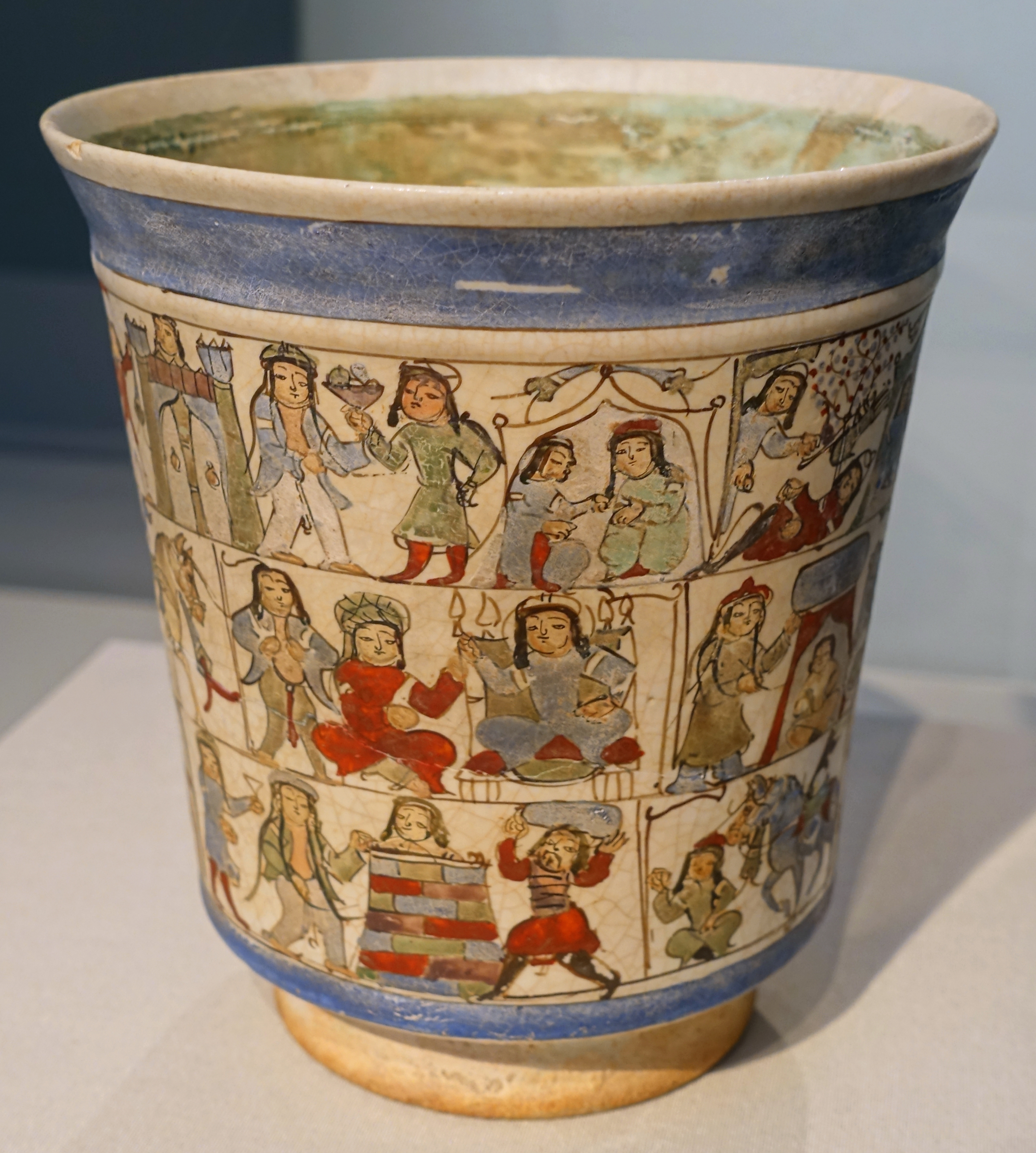
Beaker illustrating the story of Bijan and Manijeh from the Shahnama, Freer Gallery of Art.

A few pieces have entirely abstract or geometric patterns or designs, but in most pieces, there are figures, usually several small ones. Images of enthroned rulers flanked by attendants are standard, as are figures of riders, who are often engaged in princely pursuits such as hunting and falconry. The "inscrutable rulers were probably never meant to represent particular rulers or their consorts", any more than the loving couples. Similar motifs abound in other media; it is not clear to what extent they reflected the actual lifestyle of the owners or users of pieces; probably, these "may indicate a general middle-class aspiration or identification" with the princely lifestyle.

Peacocks may accompany princes, and there are often numbers of the Islamic version of the sphinx, especially around the outer border of flat open shapes. Scenes and figures from the Persian literary classics can be seen. The outside of raised bowls is usually not painted with images, although some have relatively simple floral or abstract decoration, but inscriptions of text running around the piece are common. Many of these are from standard works of Persian poetry, possibly taken from anthologies that would have been available to the potters.

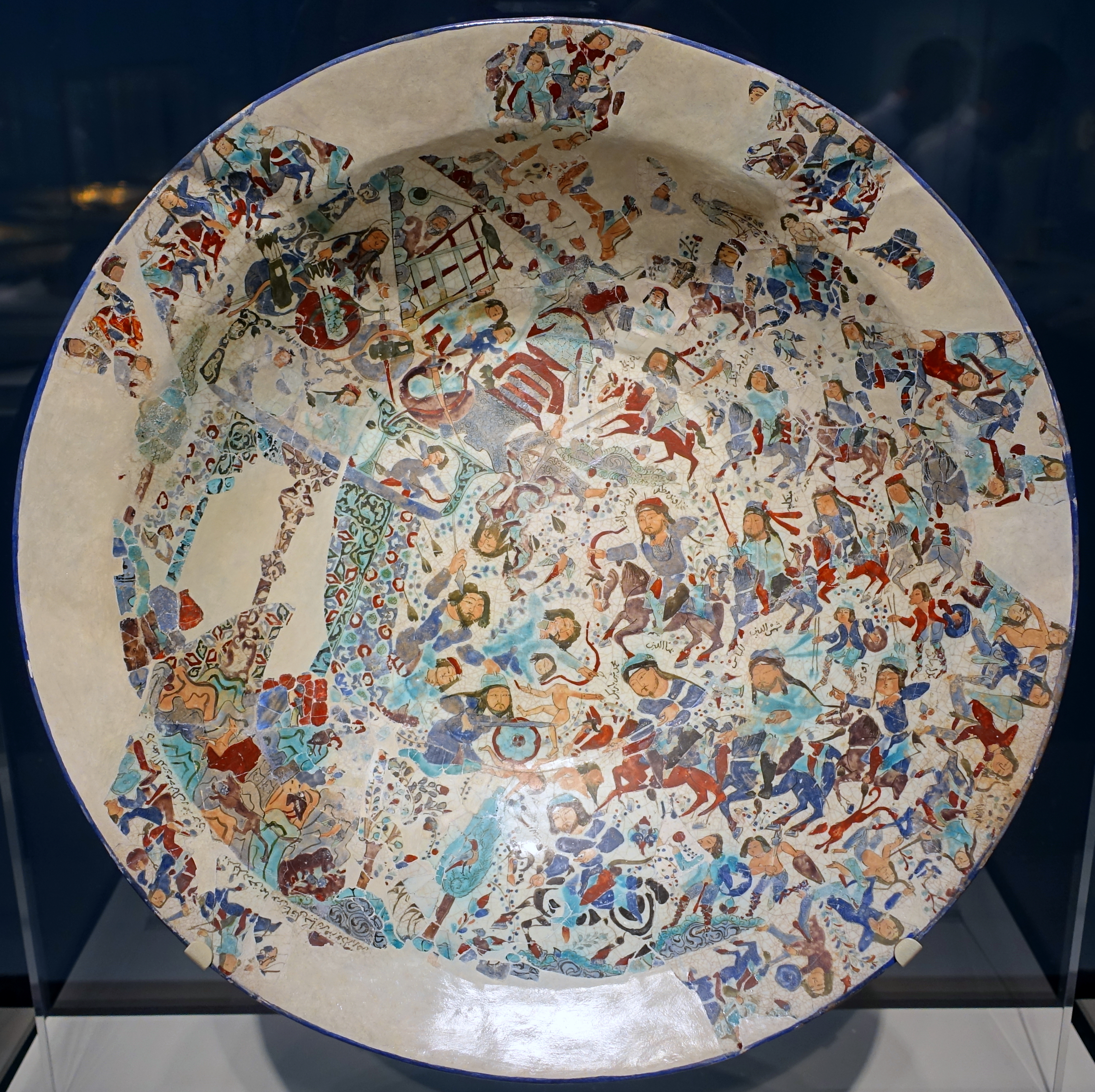
Low bowl depicting a battle scene in Khalkhal, Iran. This is the largest known survival in the mina'i technique. Kashan, early 13th century. Freer Gallery of Art.

A well-known low bowl in the Freer Gallery of Art (reconstructed from fragments) is exceptional, both in its size of 47.8 cm across and in its design; it is the largest known plate in the mina'i technique. There are a vast number of figures, all at the small size typical of other, smaller, pieces. They are engaged in a battle, probably a specific event of the period when "an Assassin stronghold was attacked by a petty Iranian prince and his troops". The eight principal figures on the victorious side are named in inscriptions next to them, with Turkish names, and a siege engine and an elephant appear in the scene. This bowl is dated to the early 13th century.

This piece may well follow a depiction in a wall painting or other medium, as may a "celebrated" beaker, now also in the Freer, which is the fullest example of an iconographic scheme taken from the Persian literary classics, in this case, the Shahnameh. Here, a whole story is told in several scenes in three registers running around the cup.

== Context ==
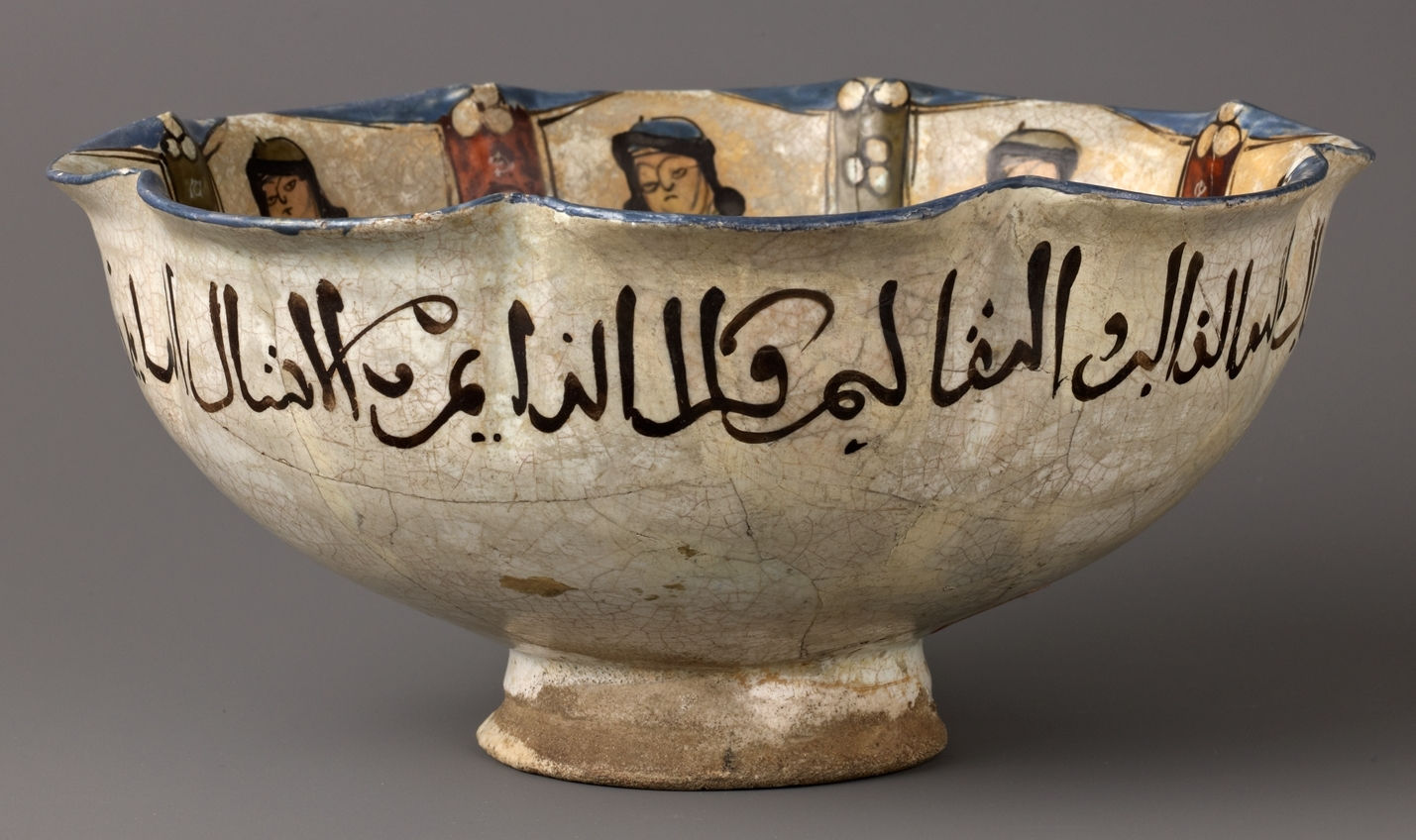
Inscribed exterior, reading "Triumph and lasting life to its owner — triumph and triumphant victory [repeated twice] and lasting life . . . perpetual and increasing prosperity and triumphant victory and lasting glory to its owner" (who is not named).

Mina'i ware began to be made during the Seljuk era. Although generally described as belonging to the "Seljuk period", some of the "most iconic" productions of stonepaste vessels can be attributed to the Khwarazmian rulers after the end of Seljuk domination.

The fifty years from 1150 saw great developments in Iranian ceramics. Firstly, the fritware body and the glazes used on it were greatly improved, allowing thinner walls and some translucency of Chinese porcelain, which was already imported into Persia and represented the main competition for local fine wares. This "white ware" body was used for various styles of decoration, all showing great advances in sophistication. Apart from Mina'i ware, the most luxurious was lustreware, which also required a light second firing; the earliest dated Persian piece is from 1179. The main colour of lustre paint used was gold; this needs to be distinguished from the overglaze application of gold leaf found in many later mina'i pieces.

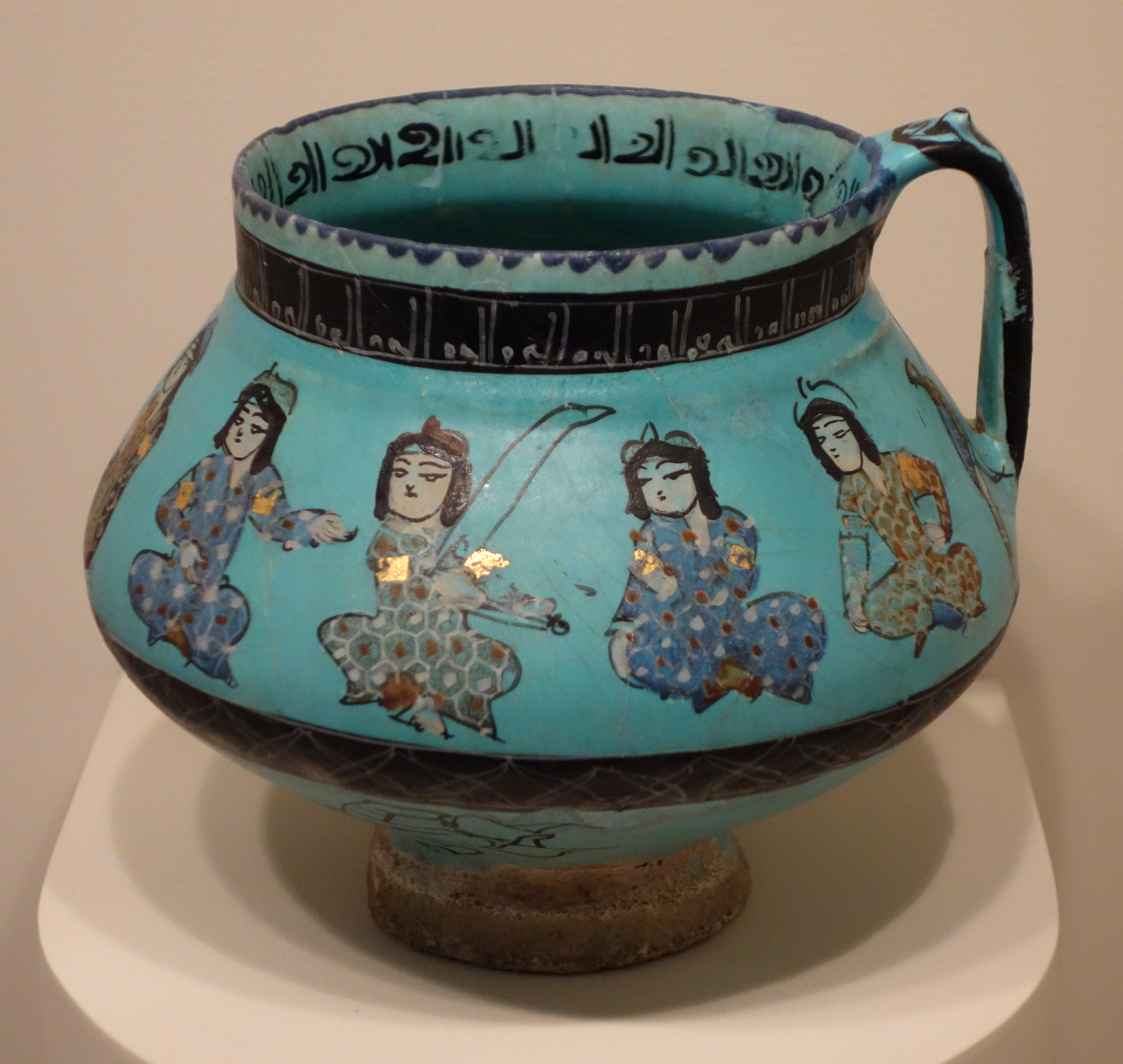
Jug with turquoise-coloured glaze

The "white ware" body was, however, not able to match Chinese porcelain in strength, and though historians praise the delicacy and lightness of Mina'i and lustred pieces, they are dubious about the practicality of these expensive wares, because of their fragility. Ceramics were not grave goods in Islamic societies, and almost all the survivals that have come down to us were broken, and probably mostly discarded after breakage. Most find sites are unrecorded; some pieces were buried unbroken, perhaps to hide them from looters. However, there are also modern forgeries and Michelsen and Olafsdotter note that "one must now be rather suspicious of any piece of mina'i, especially those that appear to be whole and unscathed". Their extended technical analysis of a large and well-known dish now in the Museum of Islamic Art, Doha, Qatar, finds that much of the dish is made up of fragments originally from elsewhere (quite possibly also medieval) that have been reshaped to fit the dish, and then painted to match the decorative scheme.

Though luxurious and considered pottery, the new Persian lustre and mina'i wares may have represented a cost-saving alternative for vessels using precious metals, either in solid form or as inlays on brass or bronze. As early as 1100, the economy of the Seljuk Empire was weakening, and silver was in short supply.

Lustreware was not a new technique; it had been used in the Arabic-speaking world for centuries, but was new to Persia. Its spread there has been connected to a flight of potters from Fustat (Cairo) during the turbulent collapse of Fatimid Egypt around 1160. Since the shapes in Persian lustreware are traditionally local, the refugee artisans likely were mostly pottery painters rather than potters. Lustreware painting styles can be connected to earlier ones in Arabic-speaking lands in a way that is not possible for mina'i ware, whose style, and possibly artists, are normally taken to be drawn from manuscript painting. It is even clearer to scholars that lustreware production was concentrated in Kashan than for mina'i ware.

The mina'i style was soon copied in other parts of the Seljuk empire, especially Syria. However, the makers did not know the secrets of the overglaze technique and used underglaze painting instead. The secrets of lustreware at least may have been held by a small number of families in Kashan. The later Persian mīnākārī style was and is enamel on a metal base, practiced from the 18th century to the present.

== Gallery ==
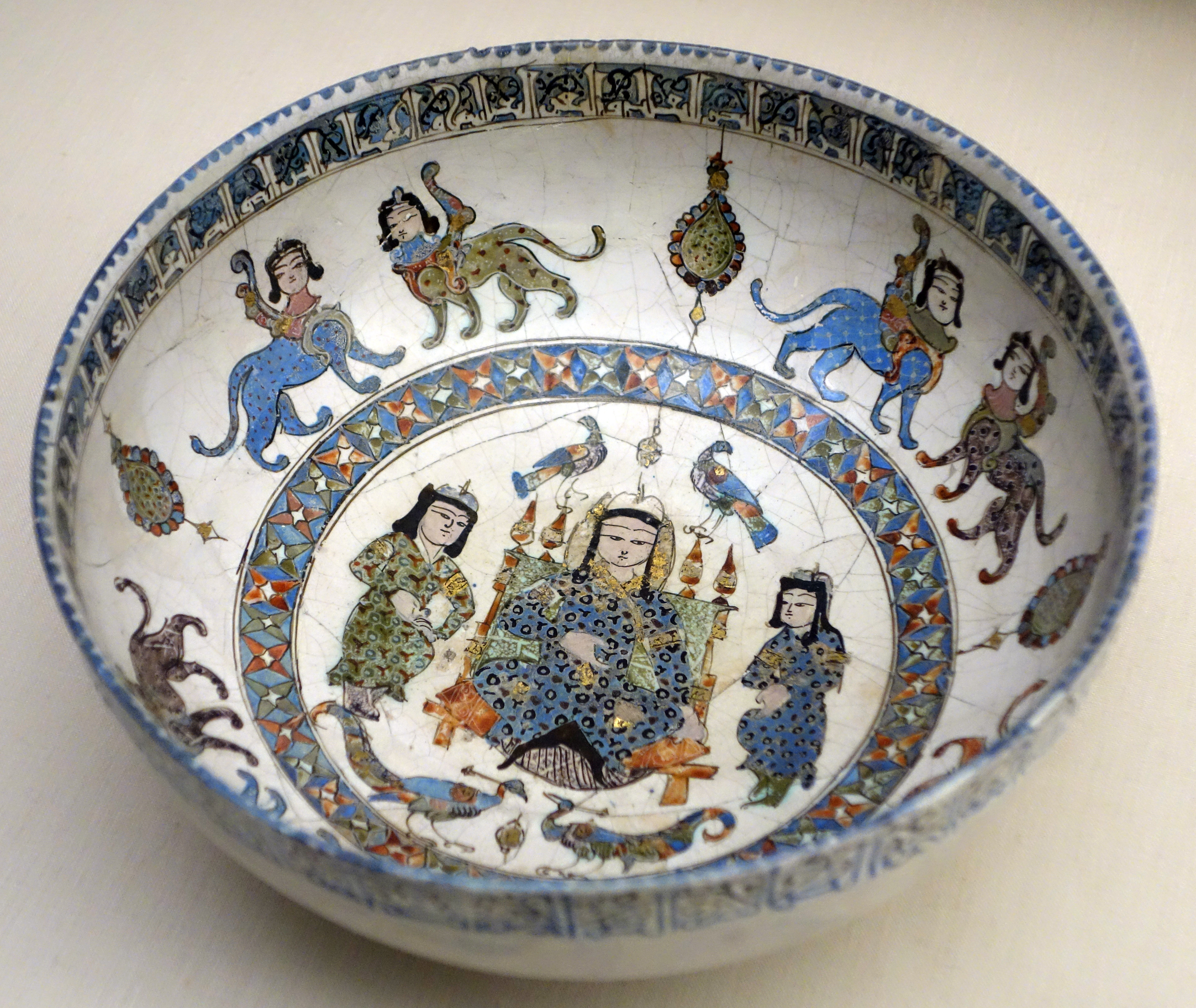
Bowl with ruler and sphinxes

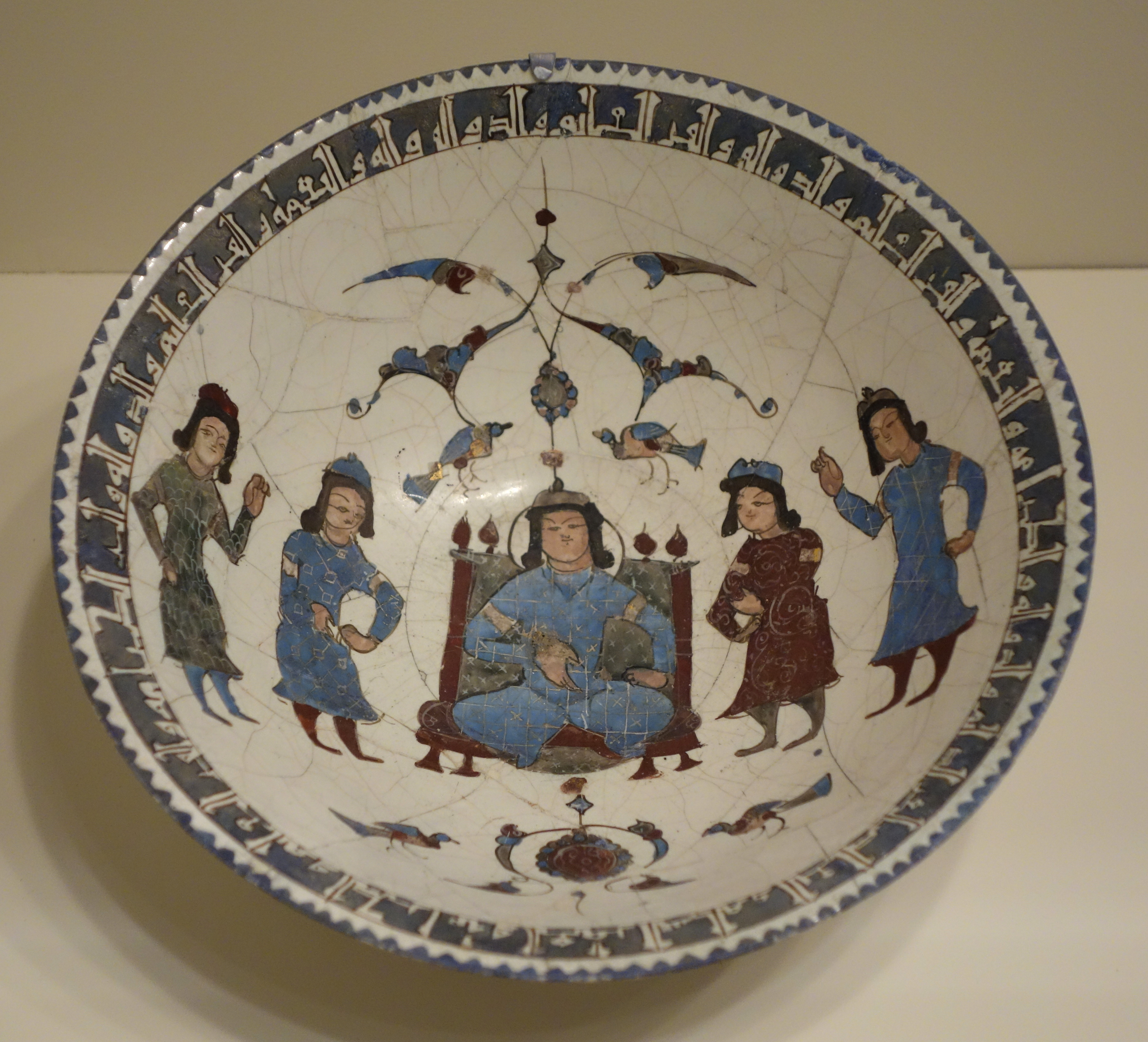
Enthroned figure flanked by attendants.

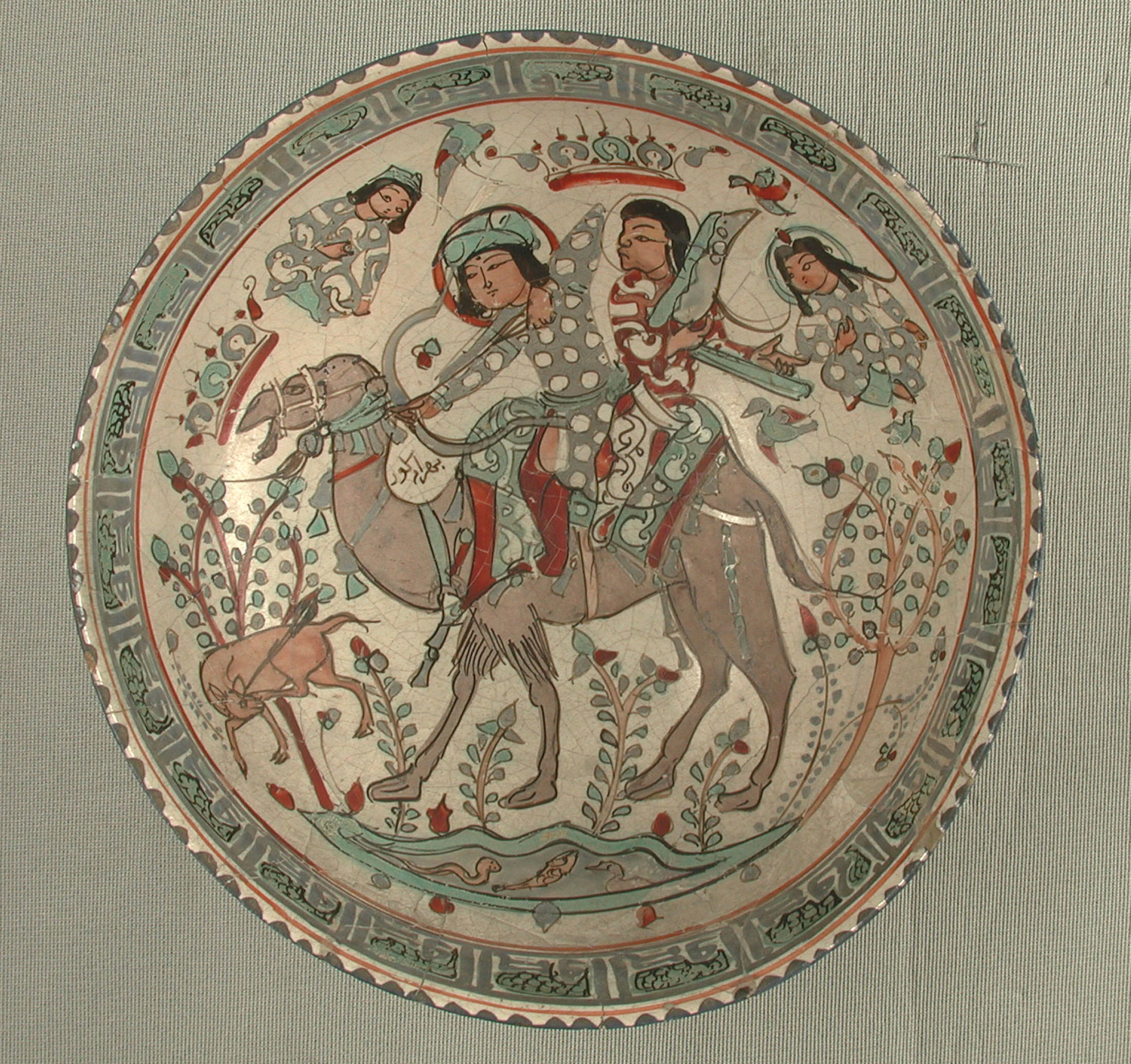
Bahram Gur hunting with Azadeh; 3 5/8 x 8 3/8in. (9.2 x 21.3 cm)

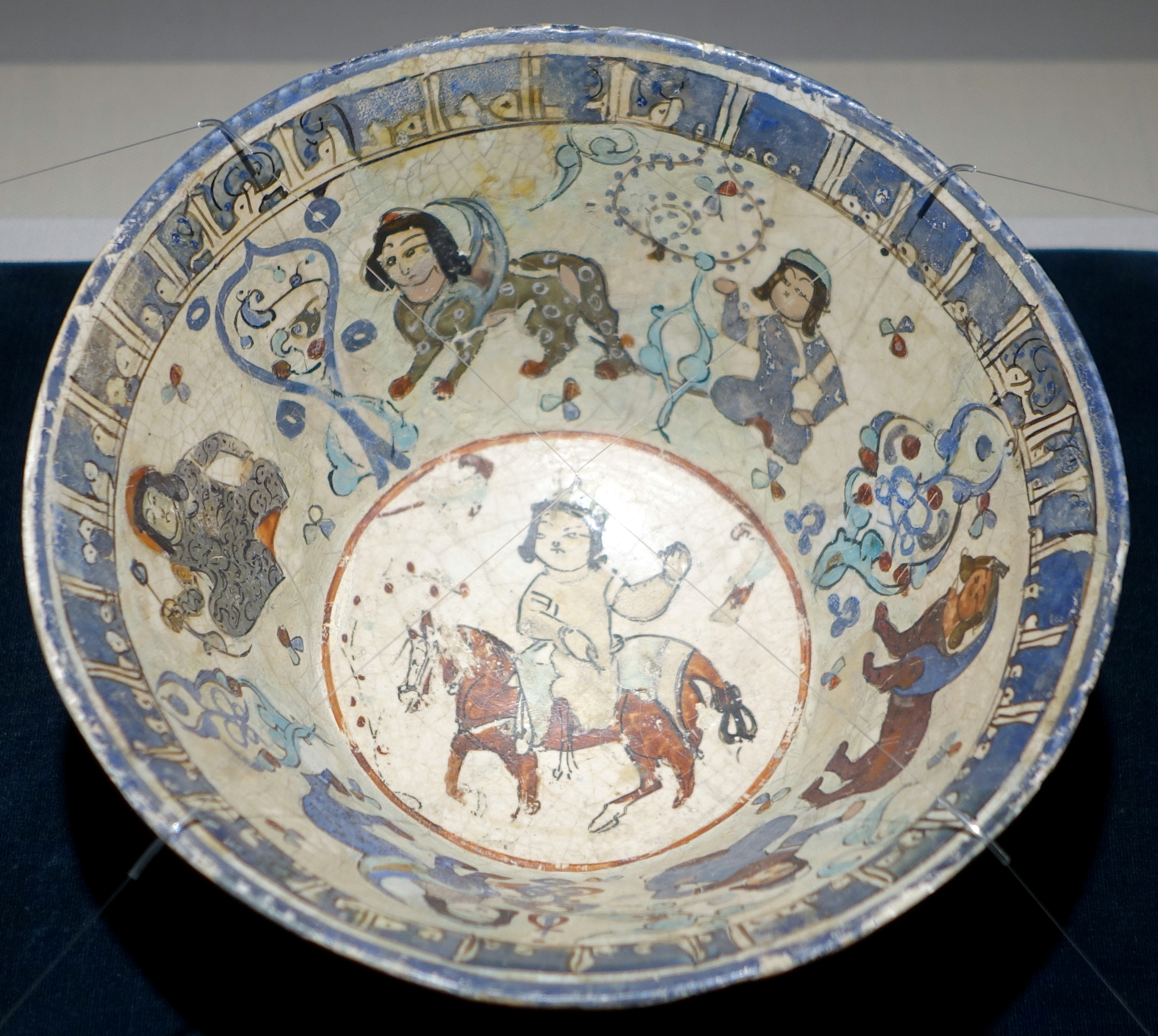
Rider in centre, with sphinxes in a band

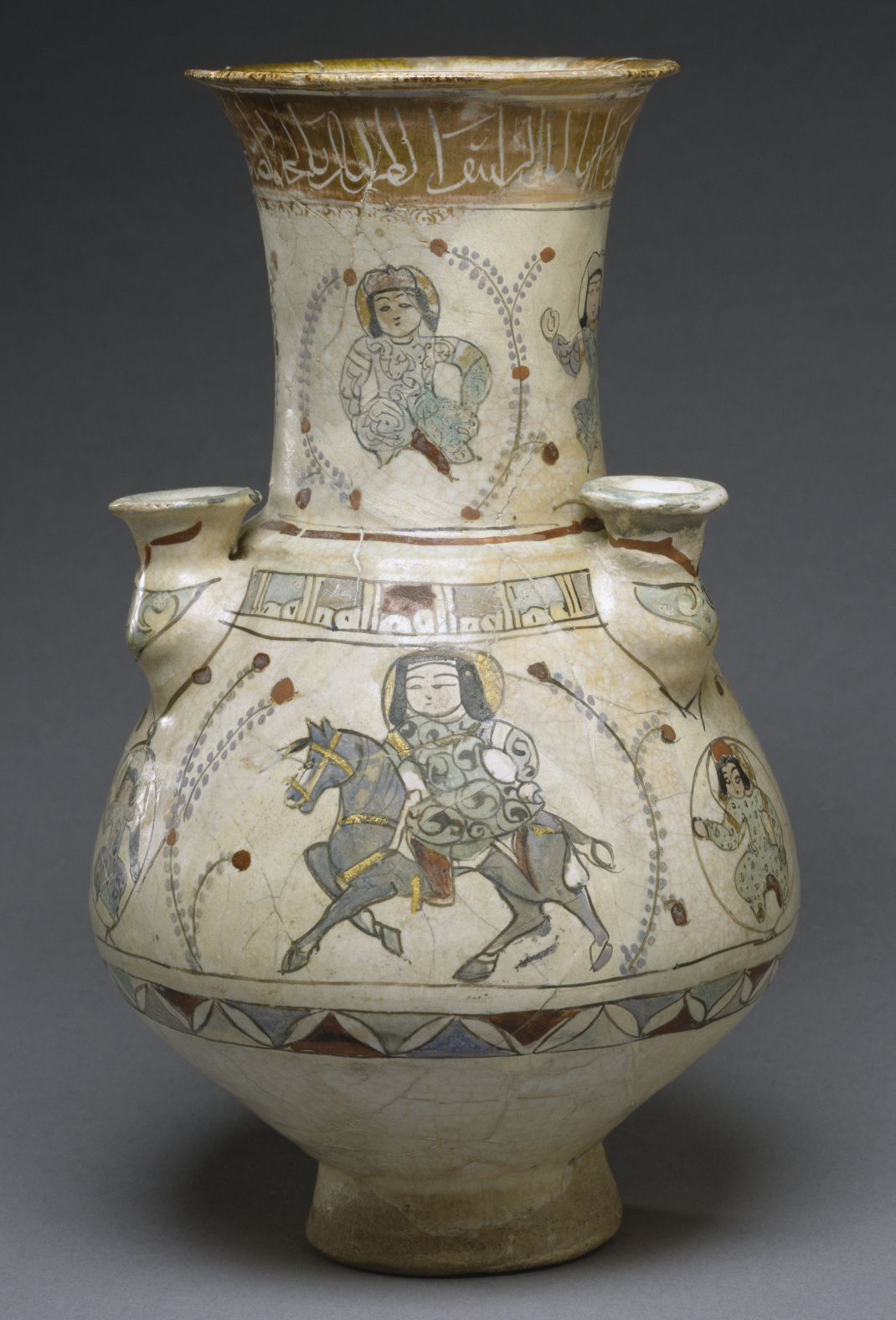
Jug with figures, combining lustre painting (top) and mina'i; 22.5 × 12.8 cm (8.8 × 5 in)

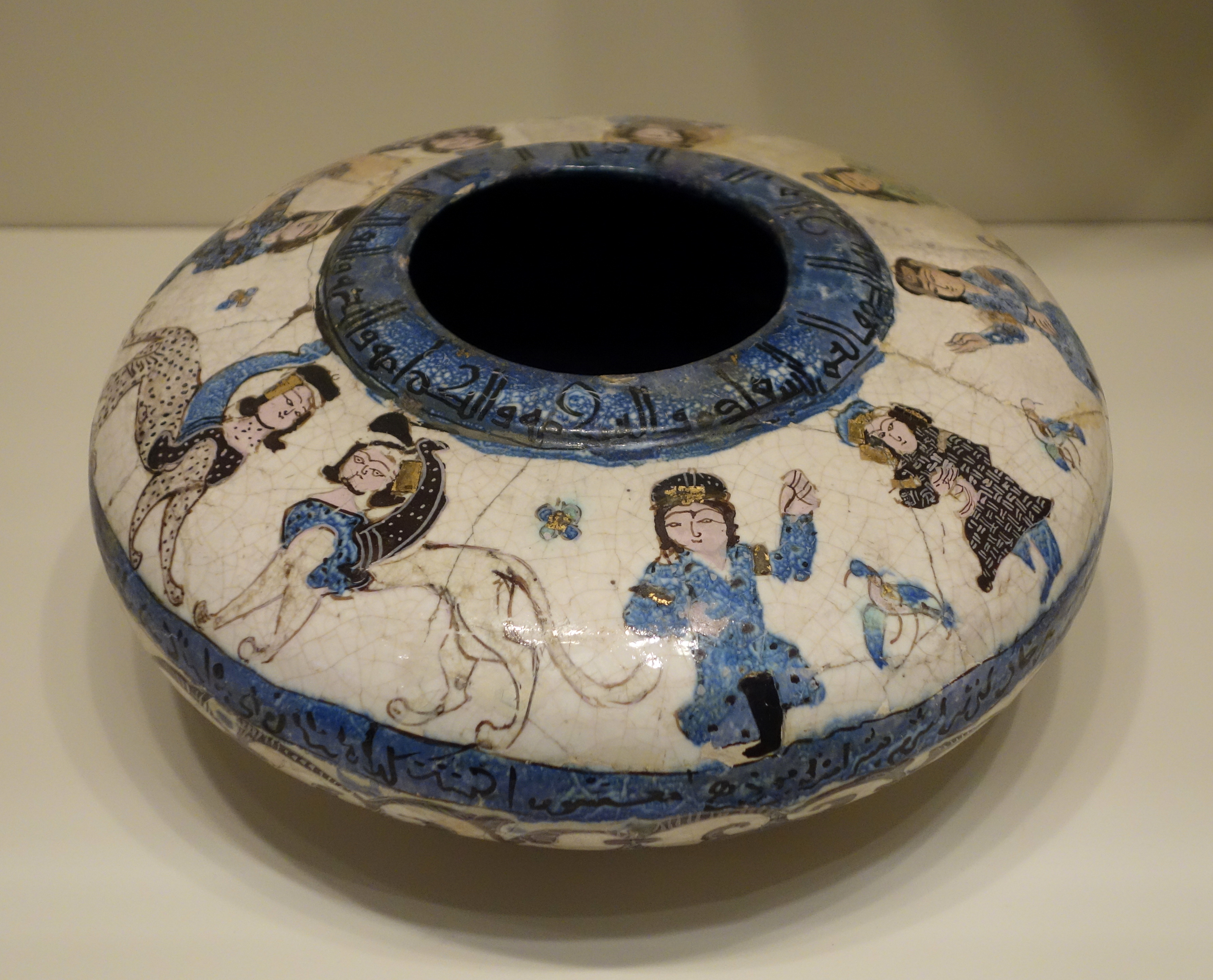
Beggar's bowl with sphinxes & seated figures; colours include gilding

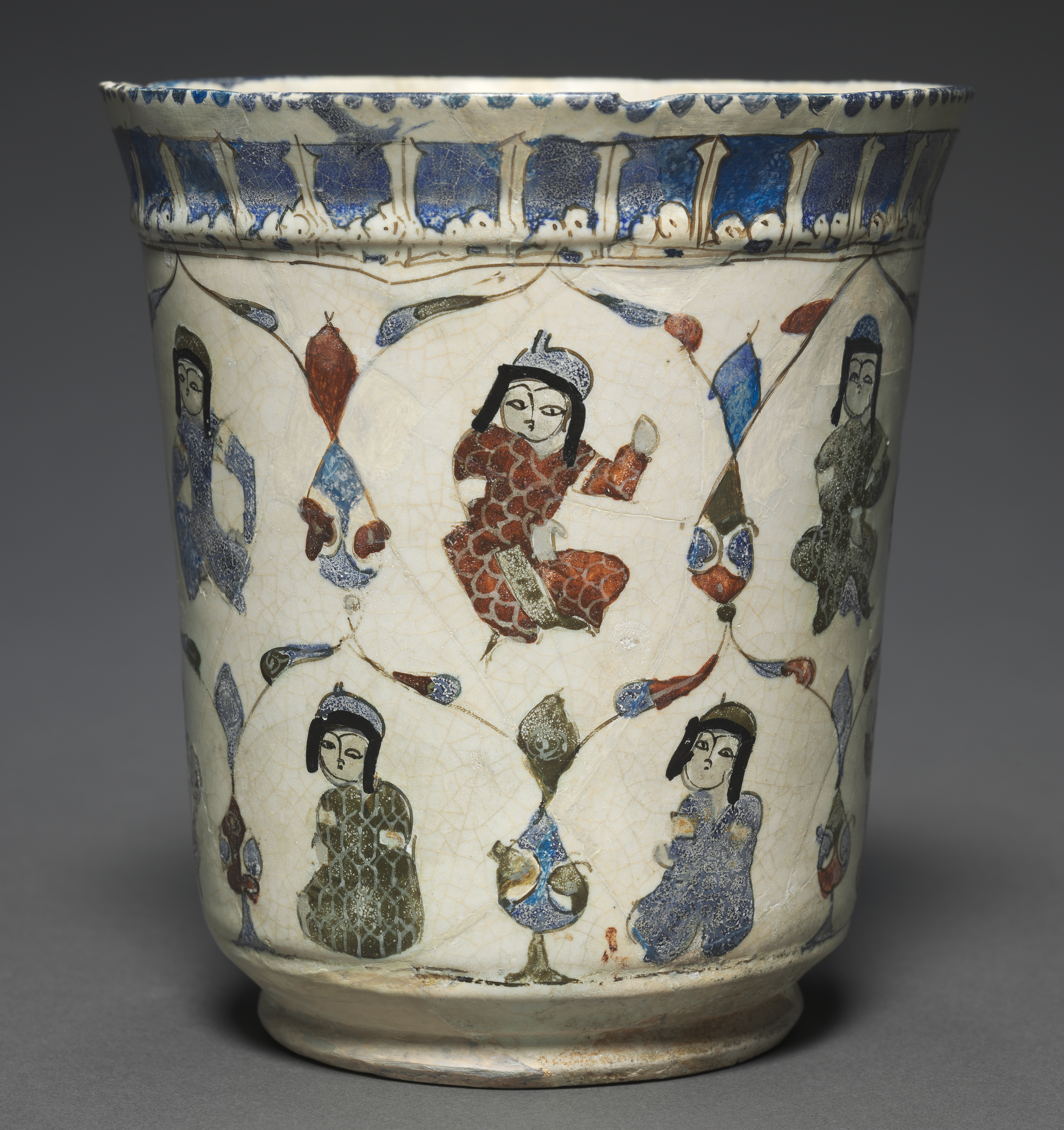
Beaker with seated figures

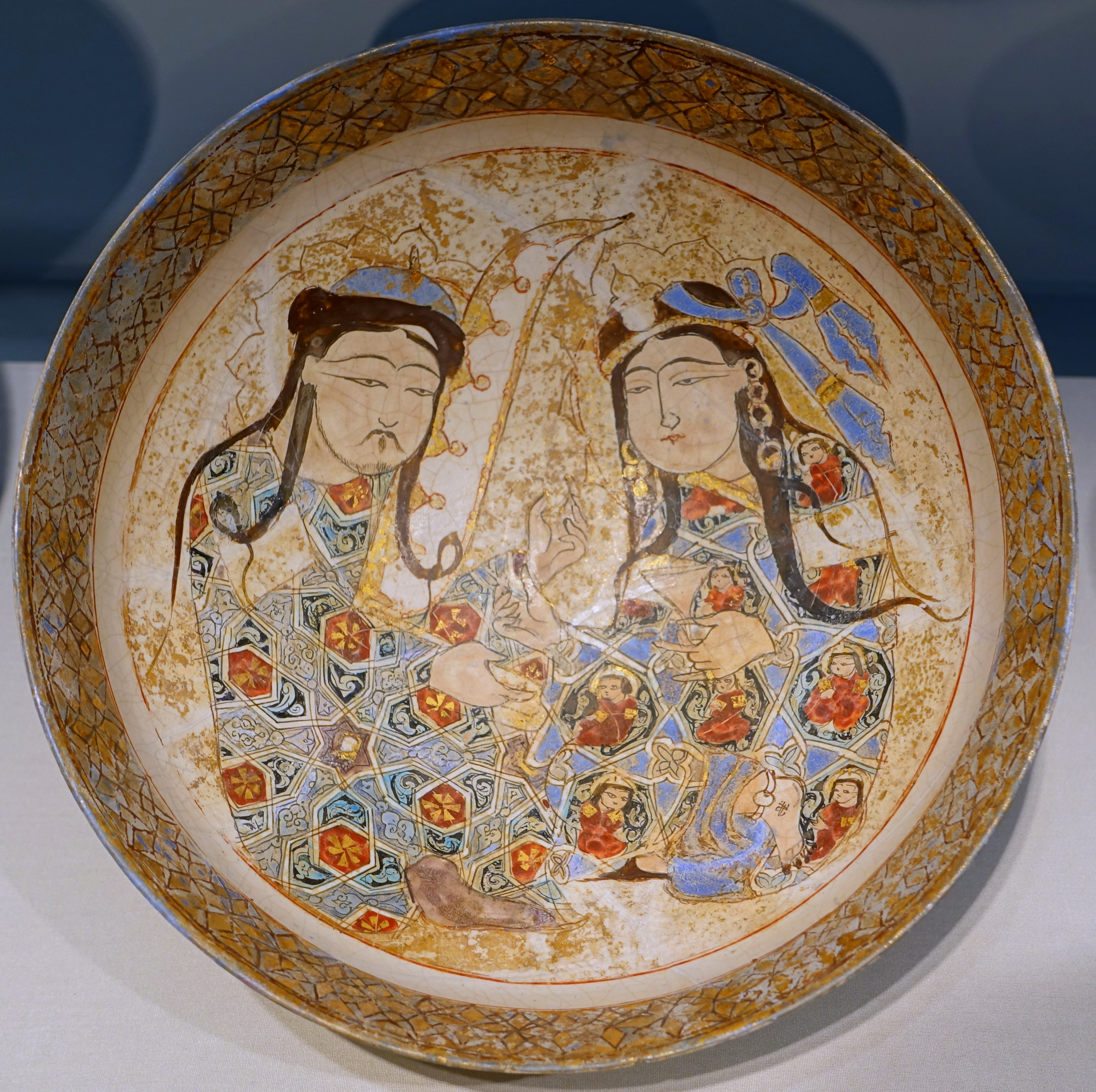
Couple

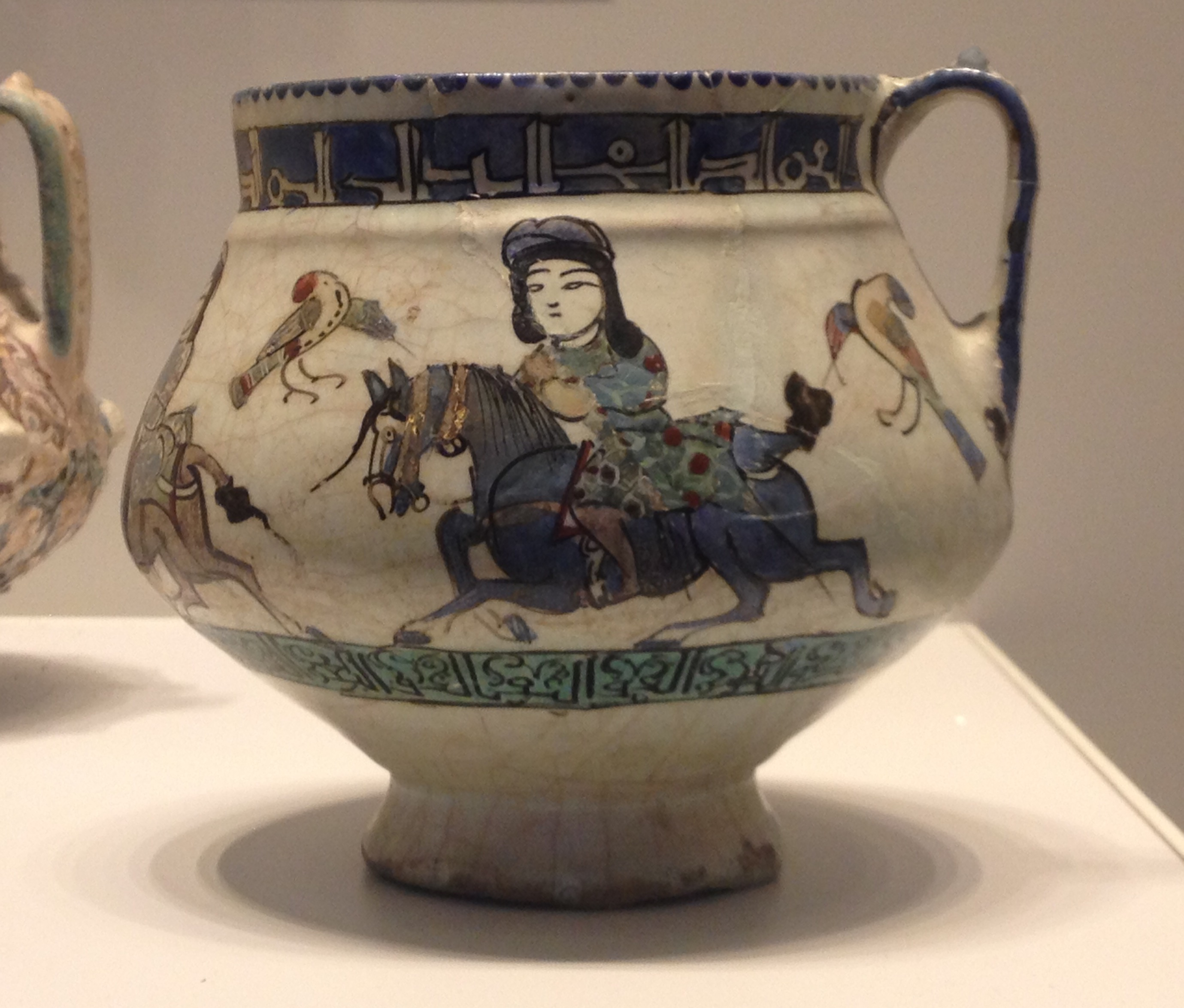
Jug with mounted falconer

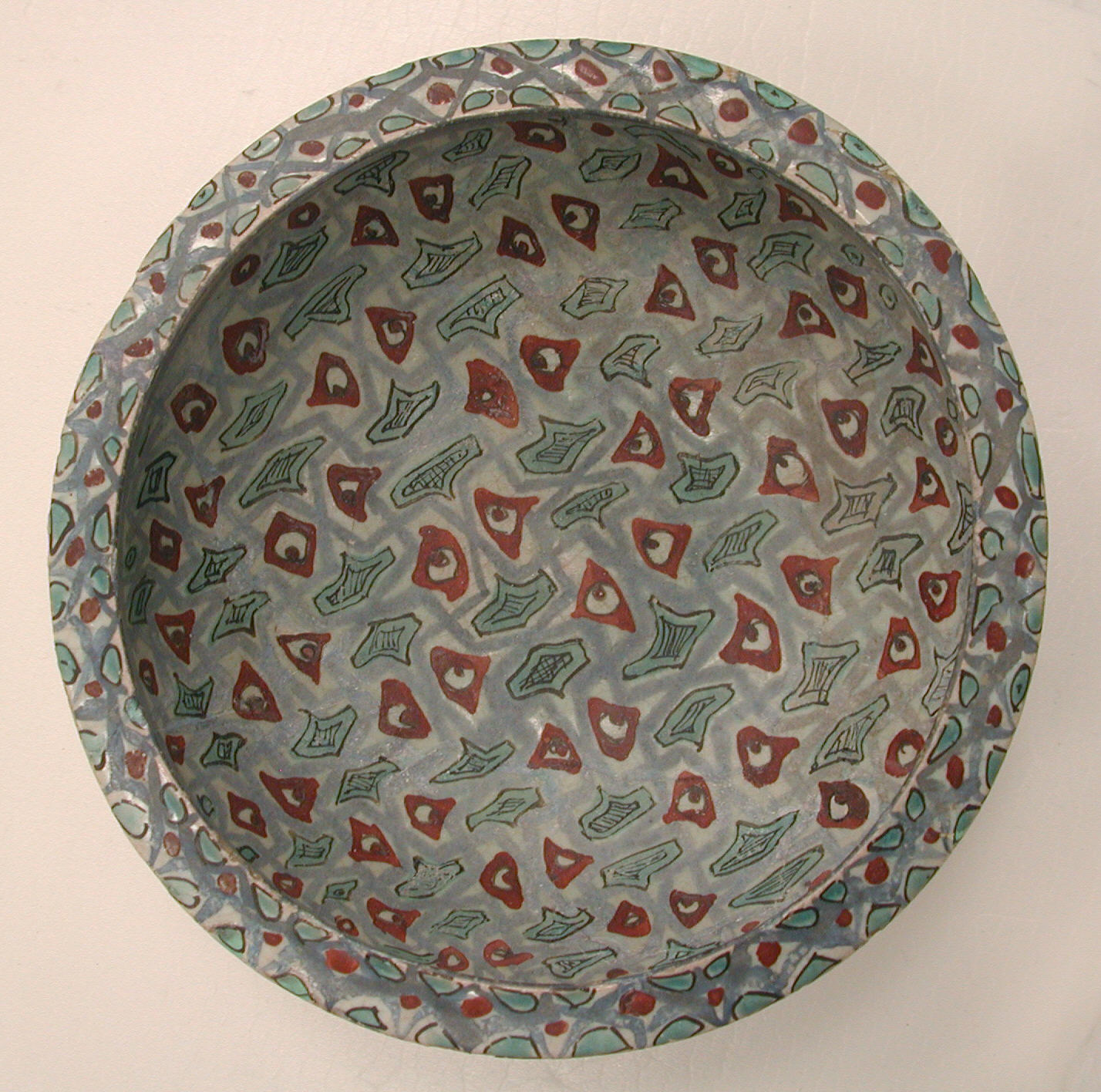
Bowl with abstract pattern, 6 1/4 in. (15.9 cm) across

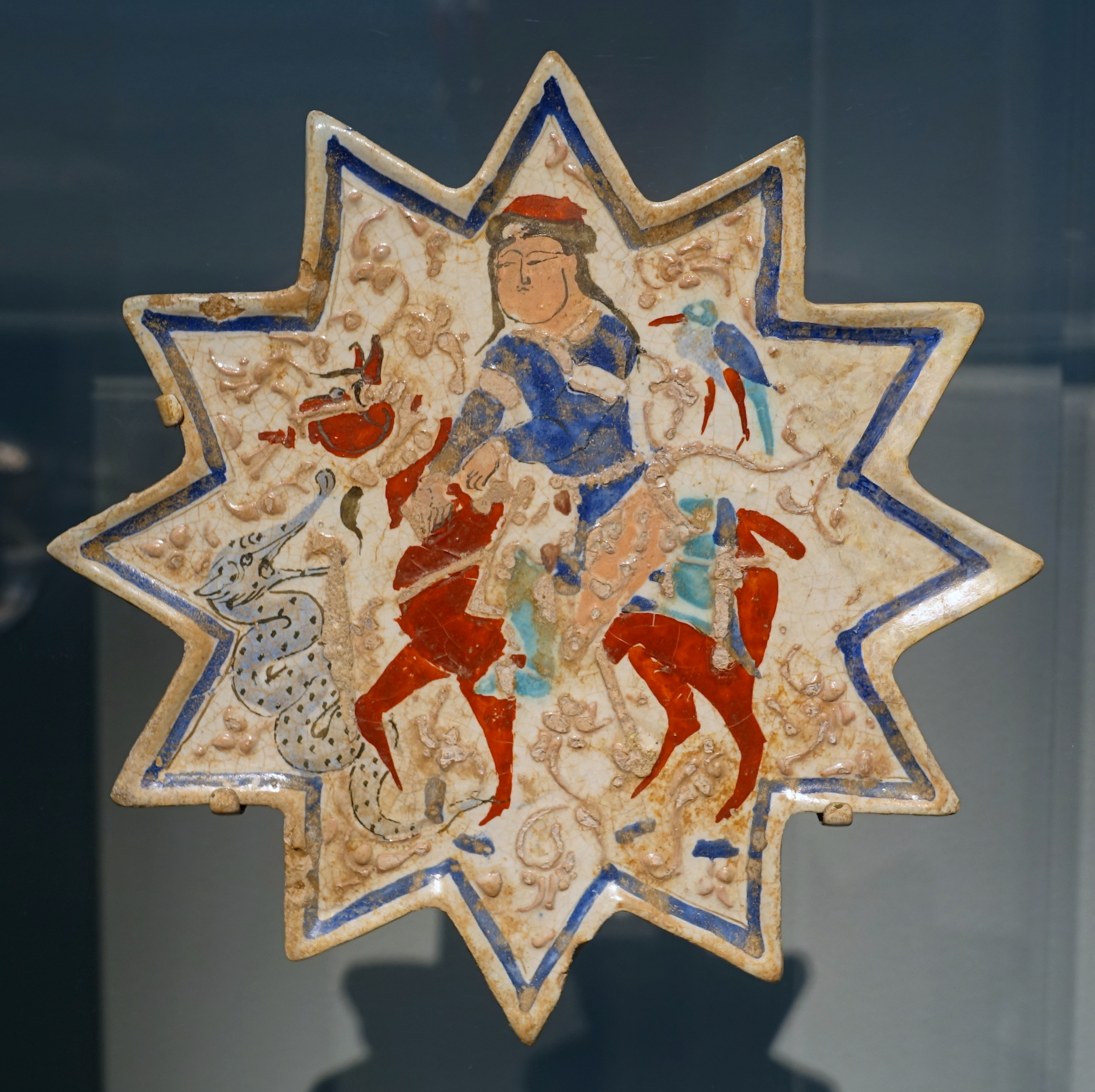
Star tile with Rustam and dragon

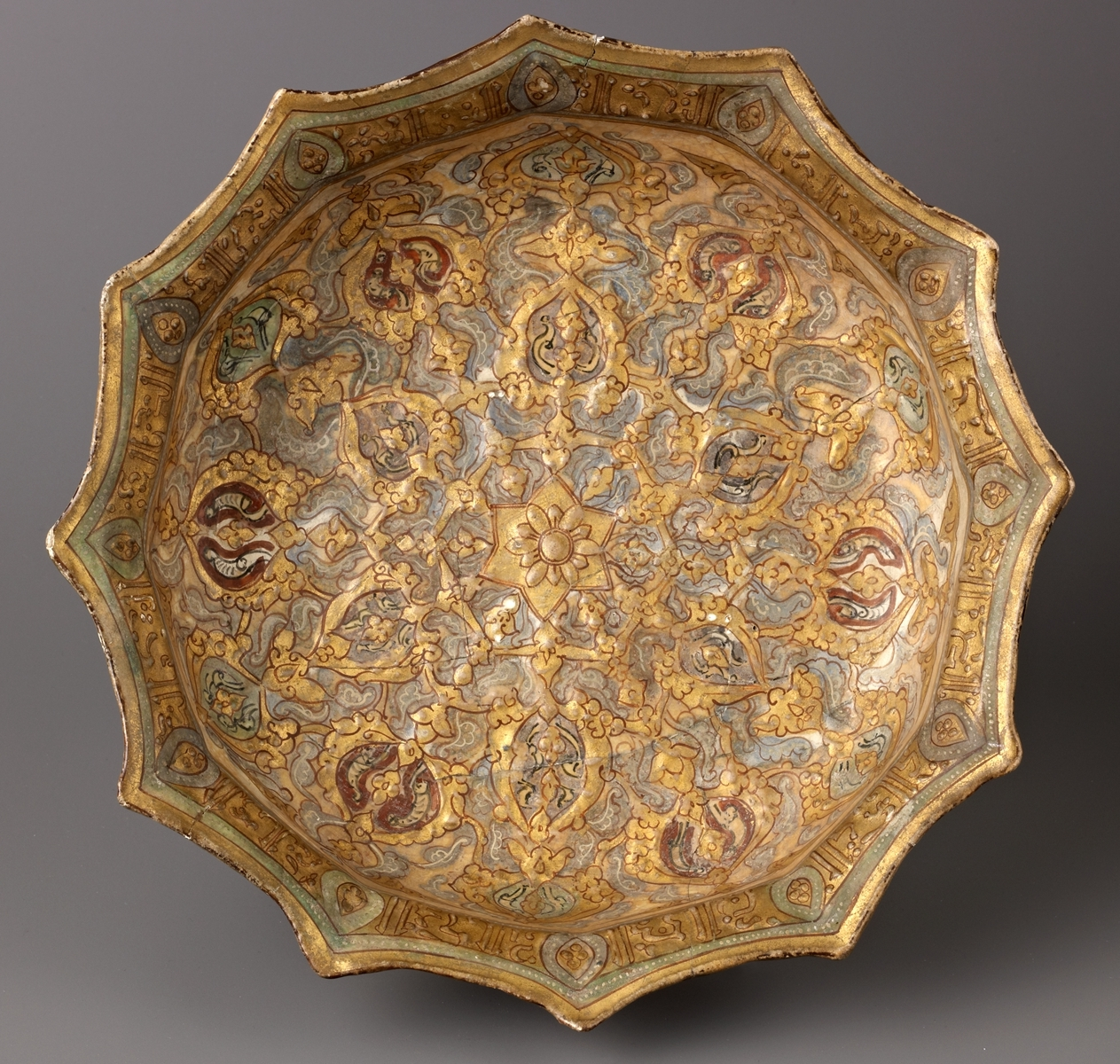
"Faceted Basin", with gilding over the pattern raised in slip. After 1200.

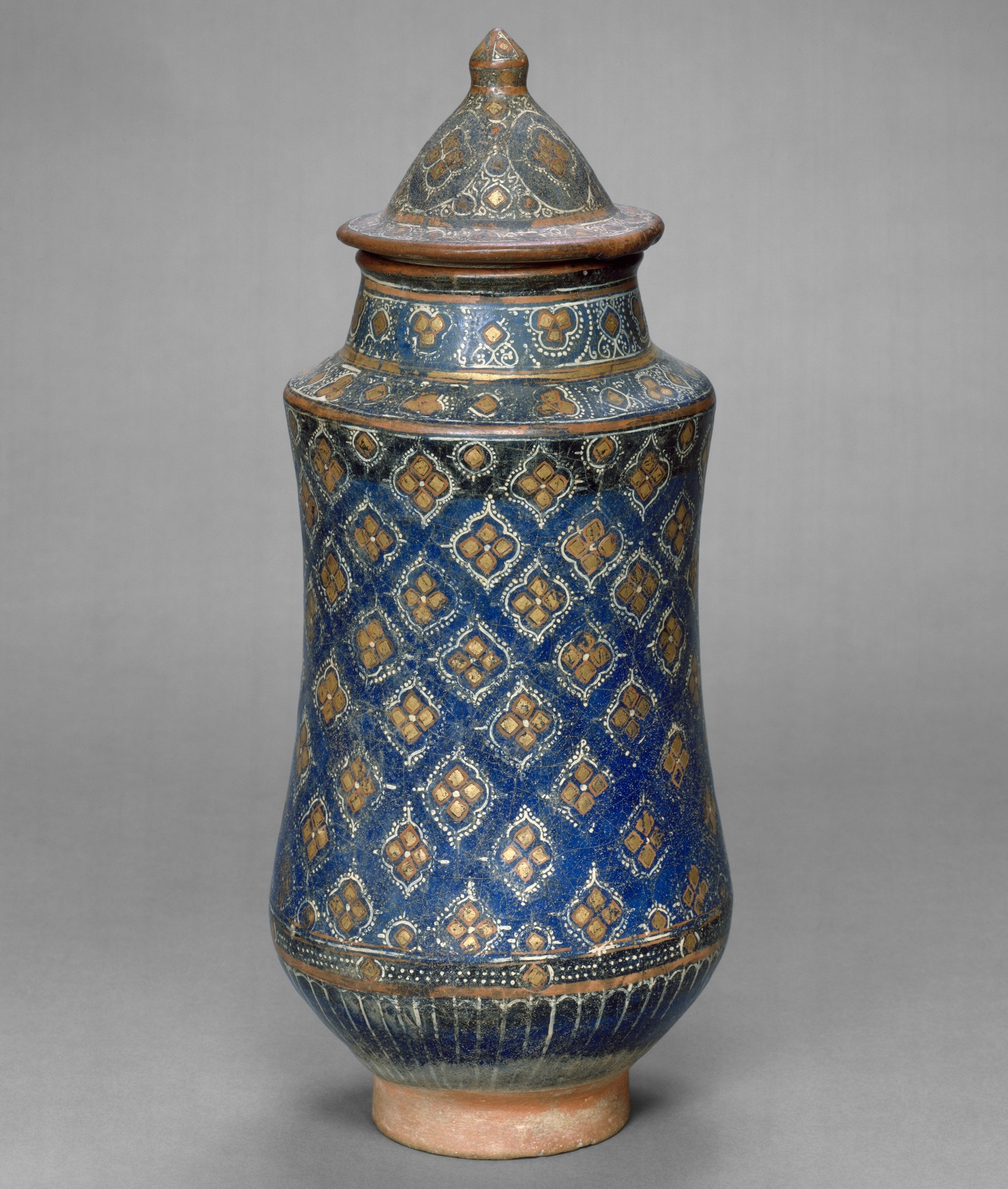
Albarello jar in the succeeding "lajvardina" style; after 1250

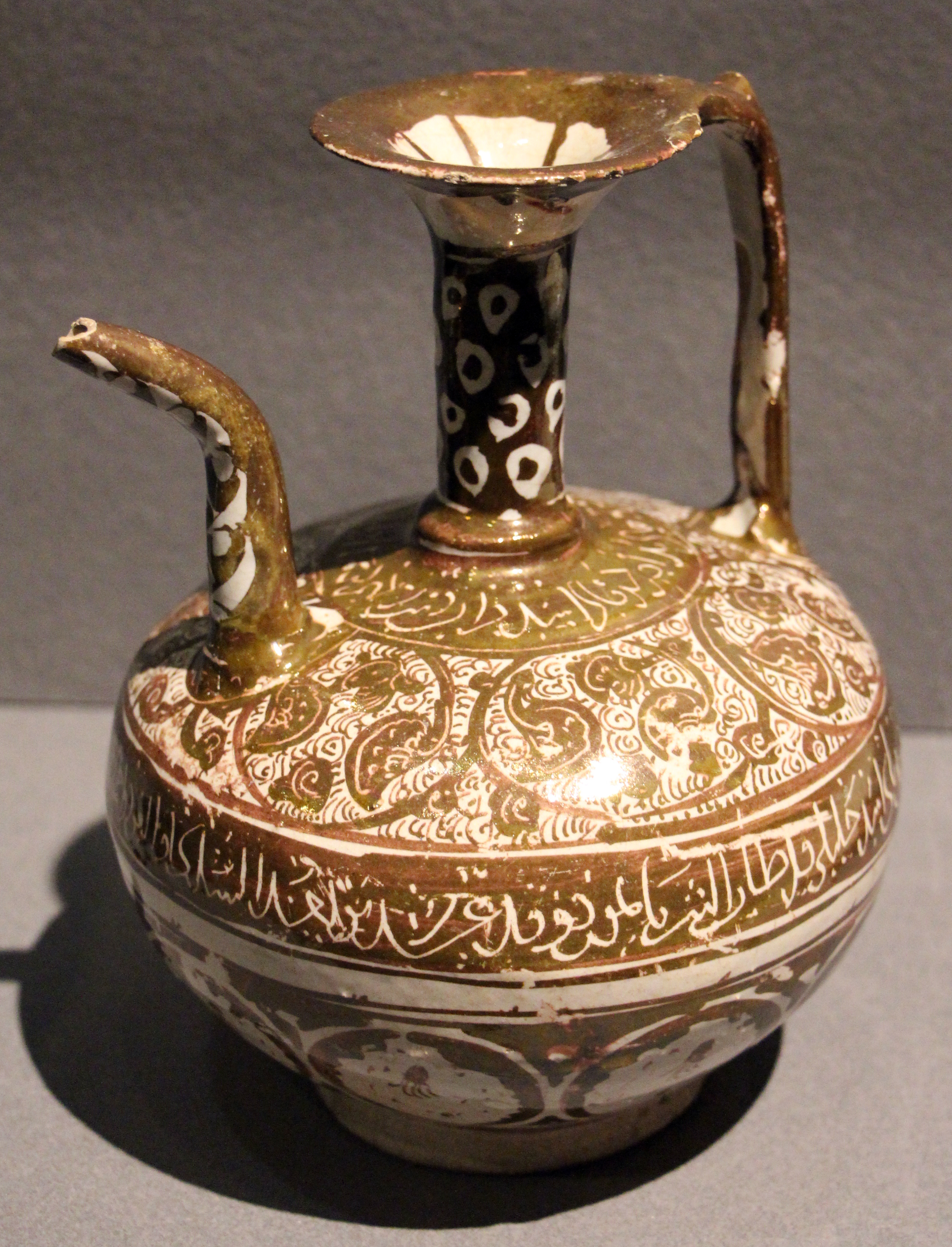
Ewer with gold lustre, 1190-1210

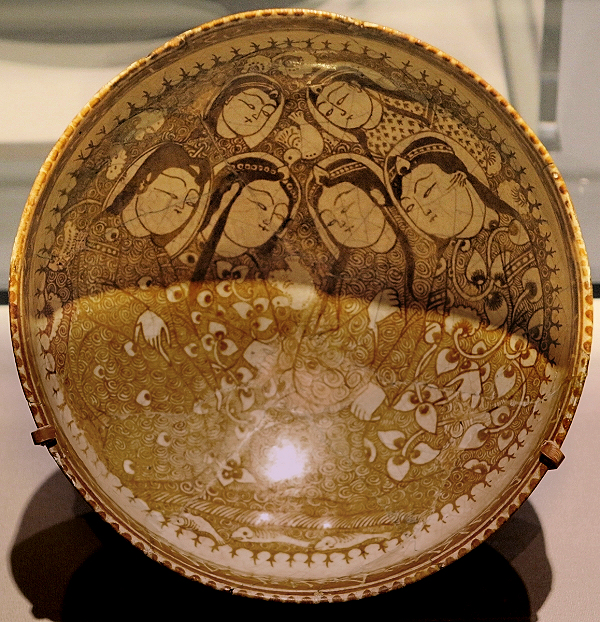
Bowl with Seated Figures by a Pond, Iran 1211-12, Ashmolean Museum
