= Astan Quds Razavi Central Museum =

Museum of Mashhad

Coordinates: 36°17′12″N 59°36′57″E

The Astan Quds Razavi Museum in Mashhad, which was founded in 1937, is a public museum in Iran. Located in the vicinity of the Holy Shrine of Imam Reza (AS) and Gowharshad Mosque, the AQR Museum has been visited by pilgrims and tourists from Iran and other countries.

== History of the Museum ==
Following the inauguration of a museum in the Golestan Palace in Tehran after Nassereddin Shah Qajar's return from his second European tour, displaying a collection of exquisite objects in a building in the Holy Shrine of Imam Reza (AS) in Mashhad became a major concern for the custodians and the vice custodians of the shrine during the late Qajar period; in so far as this issue was even reflected in the newspapers of the era. But it was not until the years 1925-1935 when Muhammad Wali Assadi, the then vice custodian of the shrine and a key political figure in the early Pahlavi period, administered the whole affairs of Astan Quds Razavi and proposed the idea of establishing a museum. Later in 1936 and under Fathullah Pakravan's vice custodianship (1935 -1941) of the Holy Shrine of Imam Reza (AS), a collection of objects was selected and the AQR Museum was incorporated.

After 27 years and in accordance with a development plan for the Holy Shrine of Imam Reza (AS), the first AQR Museum building was demolished and its collections were transferred to the reception hall in the south east of the Museum Courtyard in 1972. The collections were provisionally exhibited there until 1977 when a modern five-storey building for the AQR Library, Museum and Storage Rooms was constructed on the east side of the Museum Courtyard. Borbor Consulting Group was chosen to supervise the architecture of the project with the assistance of some museum experts from England.

After the Islamic Revolution in 1979, the AQR Library was gradually transferred to its current location on the west side of Inqilab Islami Courtyard in the holy shrine and the AQR Museum expanded under the custodianship of Ayatollah Abbas Vaez Tabasi (1979-2016). The Museum Department is currently administered by the Organisation of the Libraries, Museums and Archives of Astan Quds Razavi and comprises three subsidiary offices (the Curatorial Departments, the Research, and the Conservation and Restoration), a reference library, and the following four buildings which are annually visited by pilgrims and tourists.

== The Curatorial Departments Office ==
This office administers seven curatorial departments which exhibit and care for the objects in the AQR Museum.

== The Research Office ==
The AQR Museum has a dedicated Research Office.

== The Conservation and Restoration Office ==
Since its founding in 2003, the Conservation and Restoration Office has been responsible for the preservation, investigation and restoration of the AQR Museum's collections.

== The AQR Museum's Reference Library ==
The Reference Library which opened in 1998 is the central research library of Astan Quds Razavi Museum. The primary mission of the library, which is located on the first floor of the Research Office building, is to support the research activities of the Museum staff, students and researchers.

== The AQR Museum Building Number 1 (the Central Museum) ==
It comprises the following curatorial departments:

- 2nd Floor: Astronomical Instruments, Clocks, Arms and Armor, Vessels and Medals
- 1st Floor: Visual Arts, Seashells and Marine Animals
- Ground Floor: The History of Razavi Holy Shrine
- Basement 1: Philatelic, Numismatic and Paper Money Collections

The AQR Museum Building Number 2 (The Carpet Department)

The AQR Museum Building Number 3:

- The Department of Quran Manuscript
- The Department of the Exquisite Objects presented by Ayatollah Syed Ali Khamenei
- The Art Gallery of Master Mahmoud Farsh'chian

The AQR Museum Building Number 4 (The Anthropology Department)
