= Victorian majolica =

19th C pottery

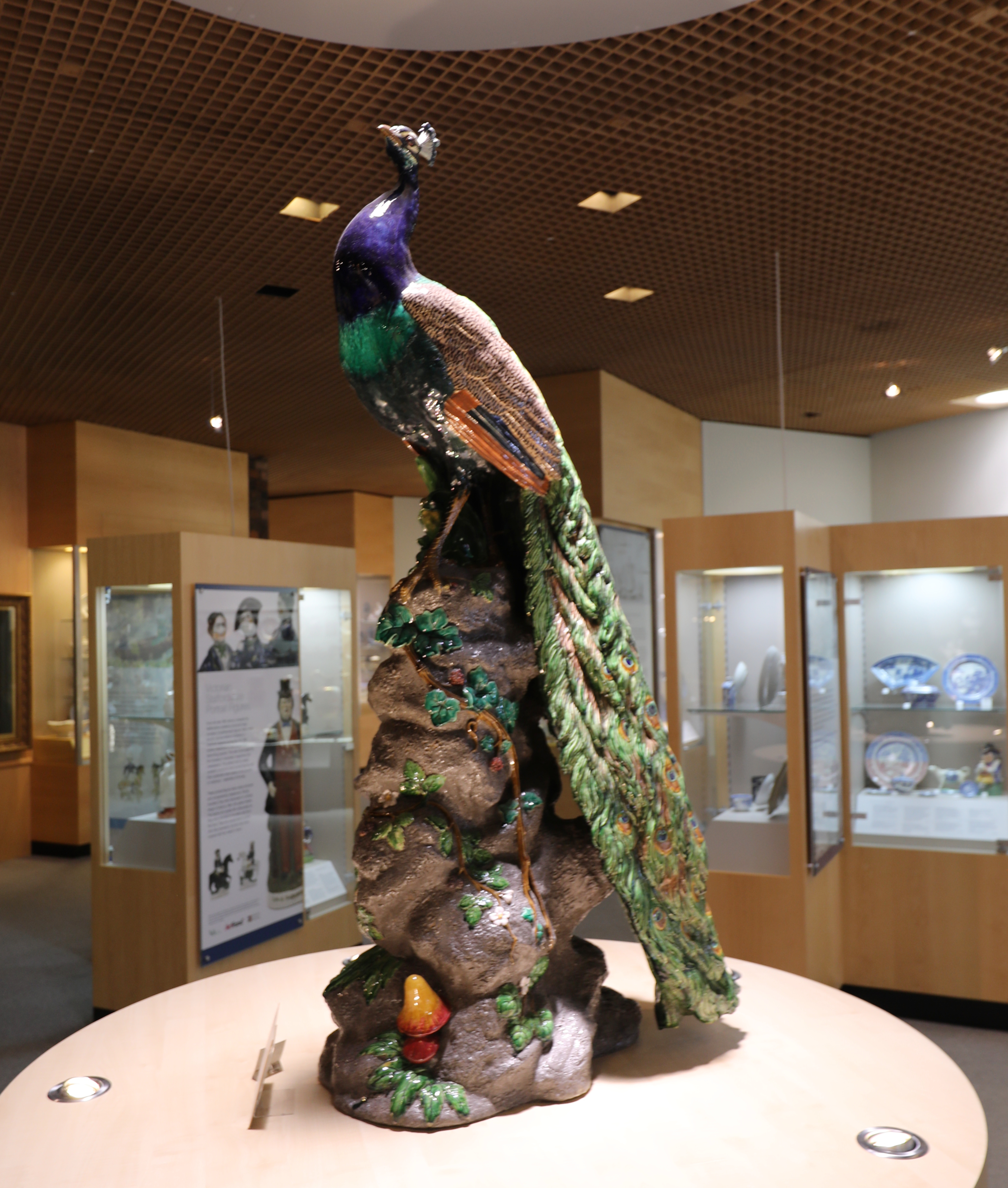
Monumental Minton peacock, circa 1870, coloured lead glazes. Naturalistic in style. Potteries Museum, Stoke-on-Trent, England

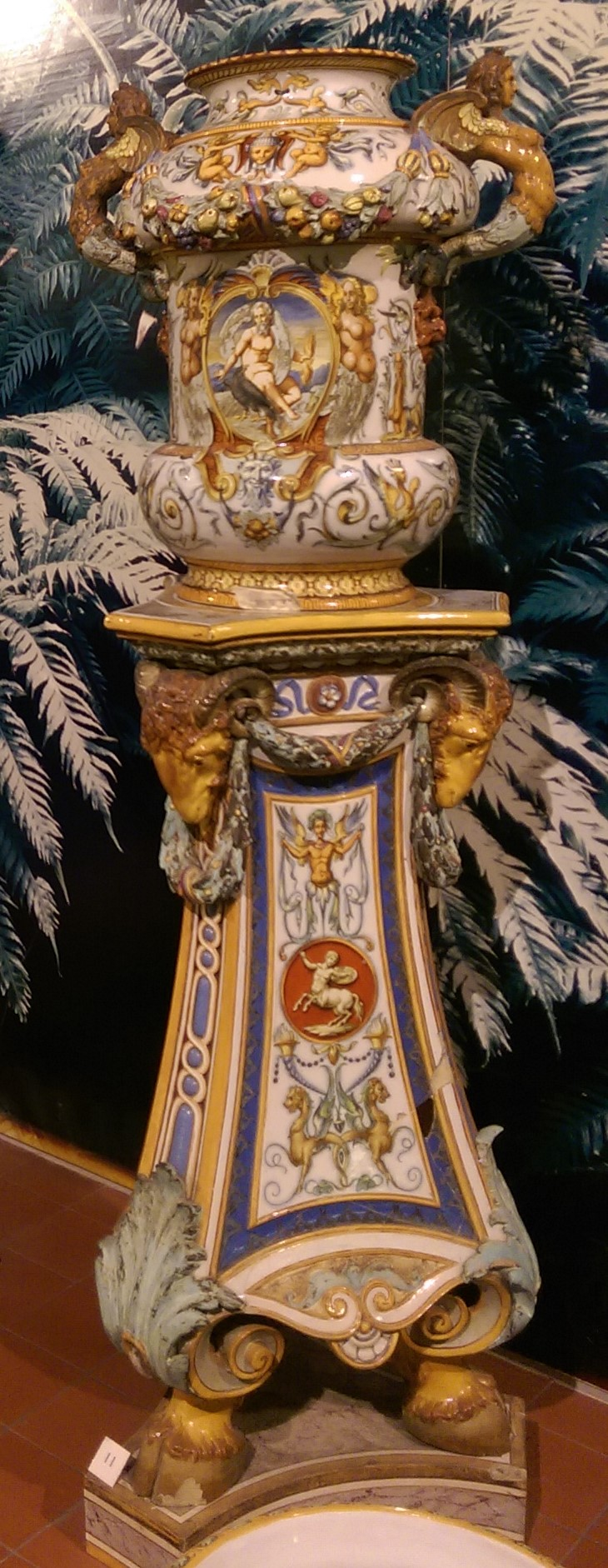
Minton tin-glazed Majolica flower pot and stand imitating Italian Renaissance maiolica process and 'grotesque' style. Potteries Museum, Stoke-on-Trent, England

Victorian majolica properly refers to two types of majolica made in the second half of the 19th century in Europe and America.

Firstly, and best known, there is the mass-produced majolica decorated with coloured lead glazes, made in Britain, Europe and the US; typically hard-wearing, surfaces moulded in relief, vibrant translucent glazes, in occasionally classical but mostly naturalistic styles, often with an element of High Victorian whimsy.

Secondly, there is the much less common tin-glazed majolica made primarily by Mintons from 1848 to circa 1880, typically with flat surfaces, opaque white glaze with fine brush painted decoration in imitation of the Italian Renaissance maiolica process and styles.

== Glazes ==
Glaze is a vitreous coating on a ceramic. Types of glazing include feldspathic or alkali-glazed, salt-glazed, lead-glazed, and tin-glazed.

Lead oxide is a key ingredient of both lead and tin glazes. Lead oxide is a flux that causes lead and tin glazes to fuse to the earthenware biscuit body at a low oven temperature, about 800 °C. The other ingredients in lead and tin glazes are typically an equally large quantity of silicates, and a small proportion of alkali (feldspar or similar) ground up with a little water and the large proportion of lead oxide to form a paste.

A coloured glaze results from adding a small amount of particular metal oxides to plain lead glaze, different metal oxides producing different colours. Since mid-19th century coloured glazes earthenware has been known as majolica.

An opaque white tin-glaze results from adding a small amount of tin oxide to plain lead glaze. Decorated with brush-painted enamels, tin-glazed earthenware from mid-15th century onwards has been known as maiolica, also later as faience, delftware, talavera, or rarely majolica, though commonly majolica in the US.

=== Coloured glazes ===
majolica n. 1. is earthenware decorated with coloured lead glazes applied directly to an unglazed body. Victorian majolica is the familiar mass-produced earthenware decorated with coloured lead glazes made during the Victorian era (1837–1900) in Britain, Europe and the US, typically hard-wearing, surfaces frequently moulded in relief, vibrant translucent glazes, in a variety of styles and forms (some examples below). Shown in Britain at the Exhibitions of 1851 and 1862, it became fashionable, widely copied and mass-produced worldwide. Also known as: maiolica, Palissy ware, coloured glazes majolica, coloured-glazed majolica, lead-glazed majolica, and misleadingly 'lead or tin glazed' majolica.

Some coloured glazes majolica was produced in traditional Classical or Revivalist styles, but Darwinism, natural history, their English country gardens, expeditions abroad, and trade in oriental products generated more exciting styles appealing to the upcoming merchant classes. There was a boom in naturalistic pottery, often with an element of whimsy, to which Minton's inexpensive, durable, multi-purpose product was well suited. A strong interest in the world at large generated passing fashions for Egyptian forms, Japanese styles, Chinoiserie and High Victorian style. Conservatories became a fashion statement. Adorning them were spectacular majolica garden seats, flower pots, jardinières, stands, large birds and animals. The irrepressible urge to impress guests with rare food led to the growing of pineapples and egg-plants (aubergines) formerly only available overseas. These too appeared as decorative objects for admiration around the home. Minton's Palissy ware boomed. Pottery makers throughout Britain, Europe and the US copied the process with great success, albeit variable quality. Palissy ware/Majolica went global.

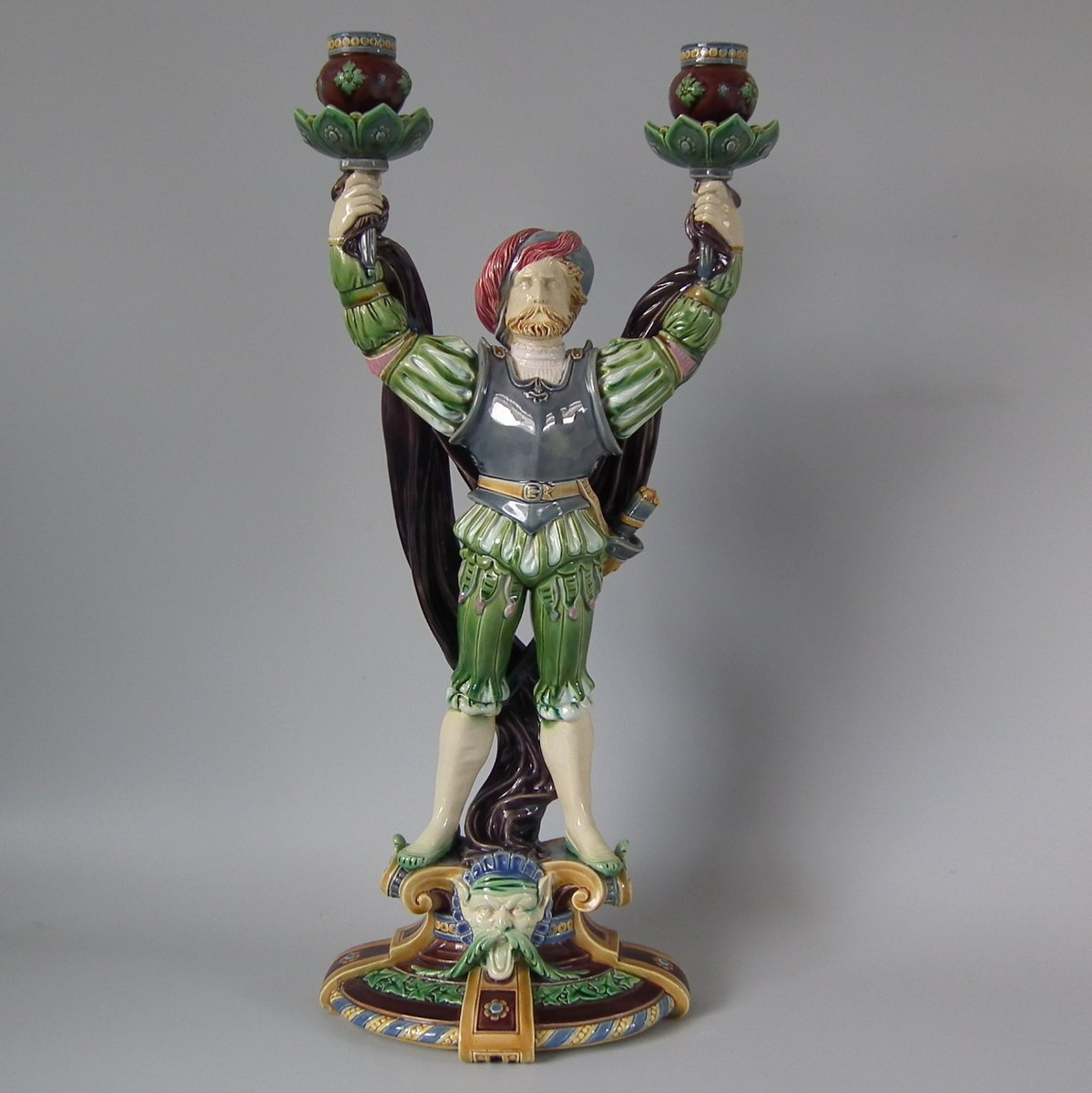
Candelabra, 16.9 in, coloured glazes majolica, 1864, Revivalist in style

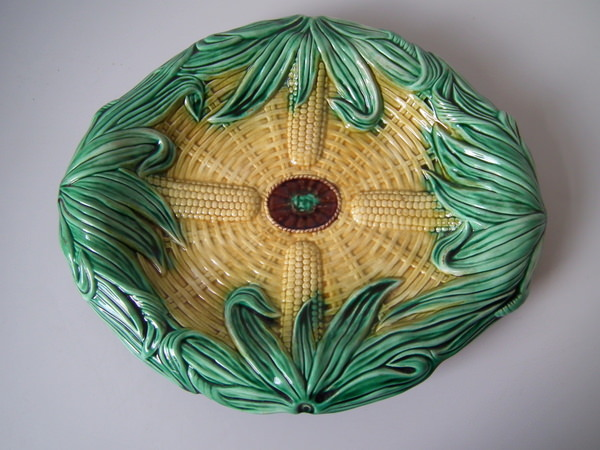
Bread plate or corn platter, temperature compatible coloured glazes on biscuit, naturalistic in style, surfaces molded in relief

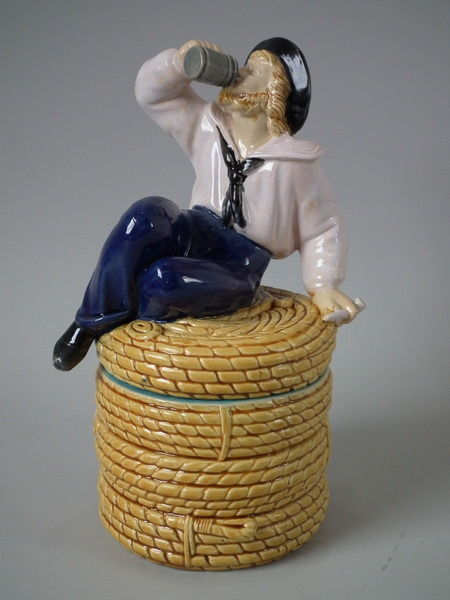
Tobacco Jar and cover, coloured glazes majolica, 1868, naturalistic in style

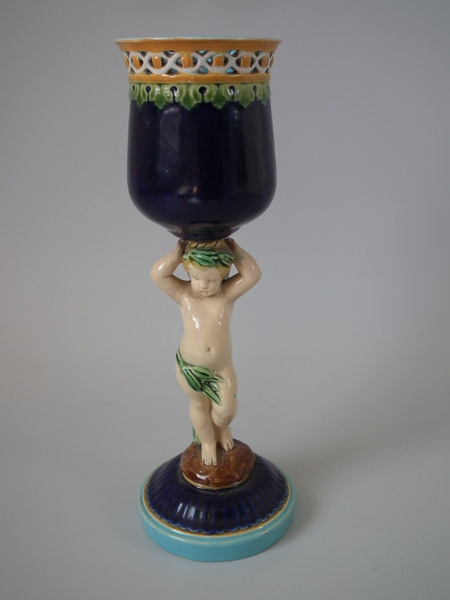
Goblet, 9.2 in, coloured glazes, c. 1869, Revivalist in style

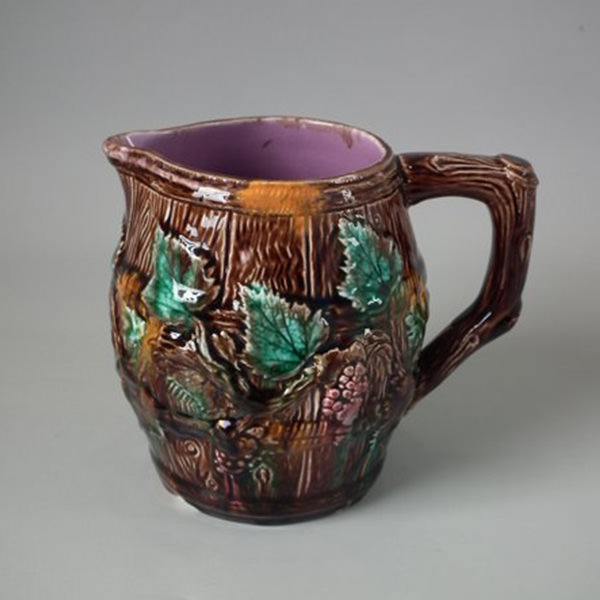
Jug, coloured glazes majolica, c. 1870, naturalistic in style, Scotland

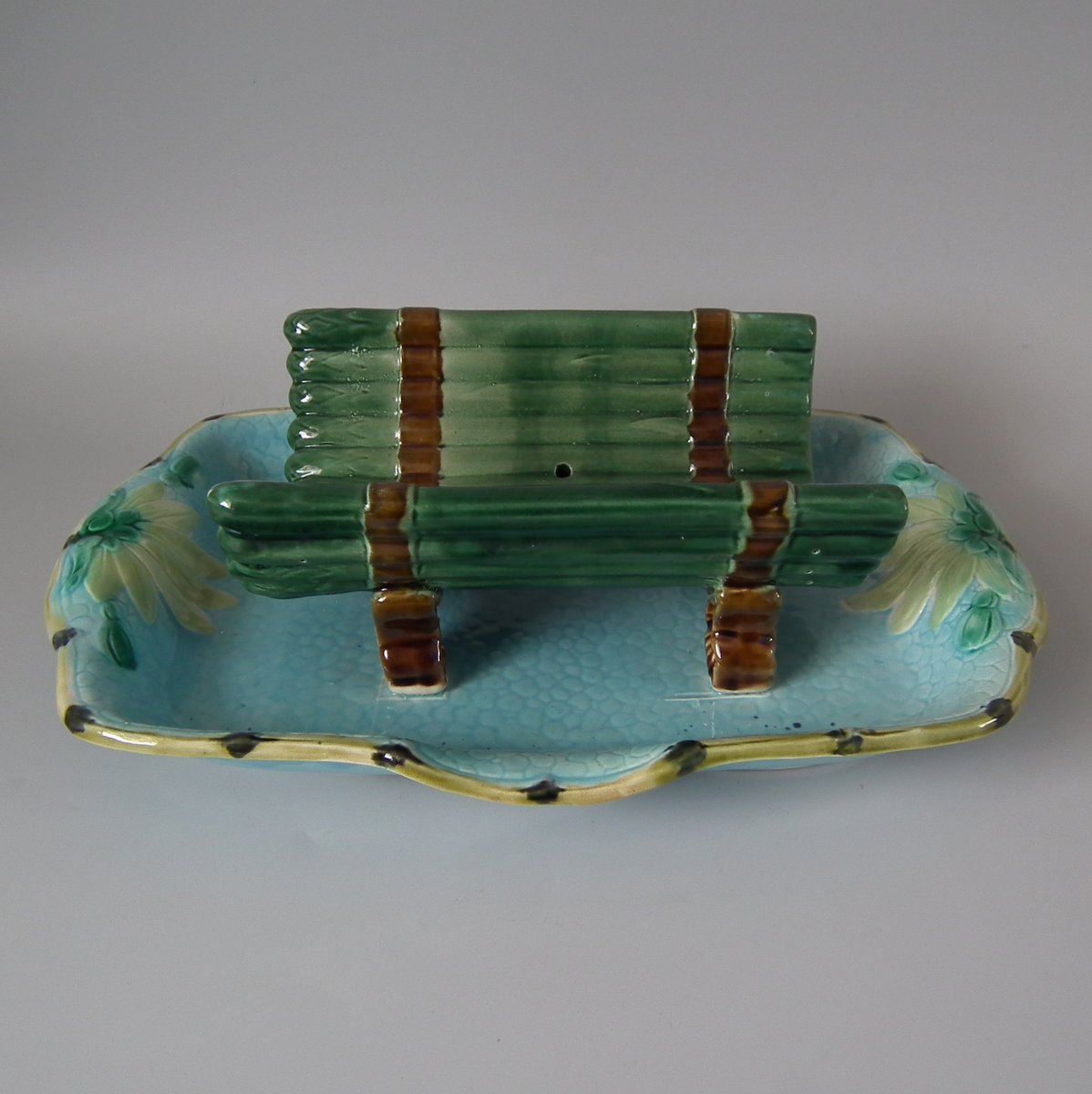
Asparagus server (table ware), 13.4 in, c. 1870, naturalistic coloured glazes majolica

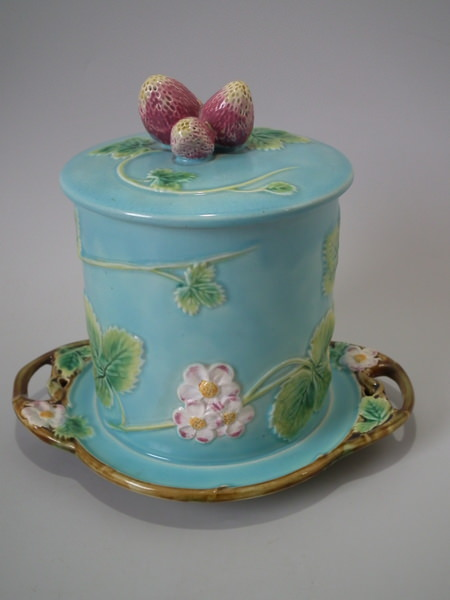
Strawberry jar and cover, coloured glazes, c. 1870, naturalistic style

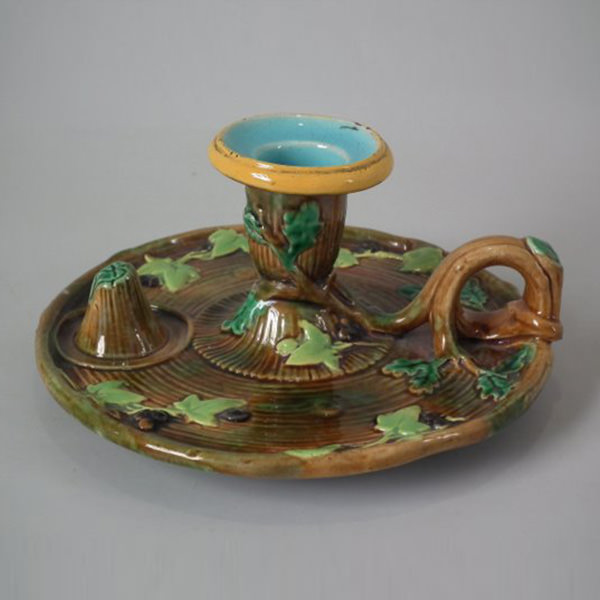
Candle holder, coloured and mottled glazes, c. 1870, naturalistic style

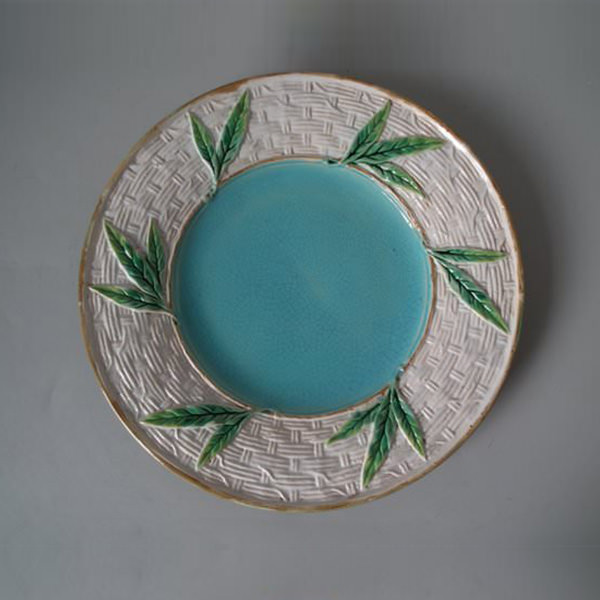
Dessert plate, coloured glazes, c. 1870, naturalistic style

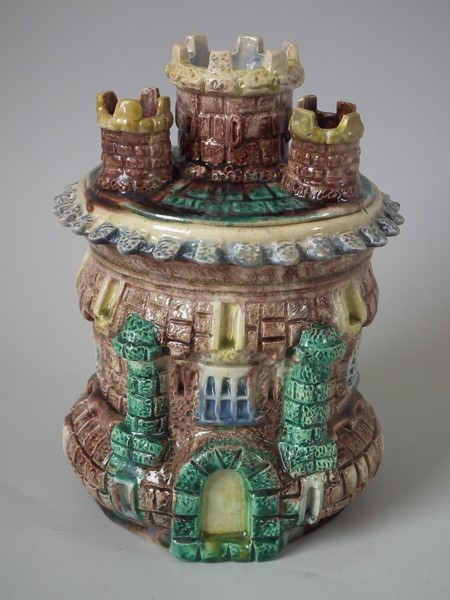
Tobacco jar and cover, c. 1870, coloured glazes, Portugal

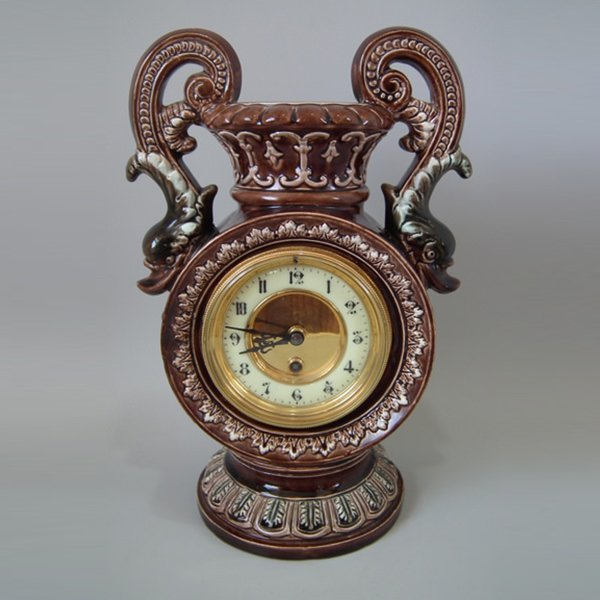
Clock, coloured glazes majolica, c. 1870, Revivalist in style

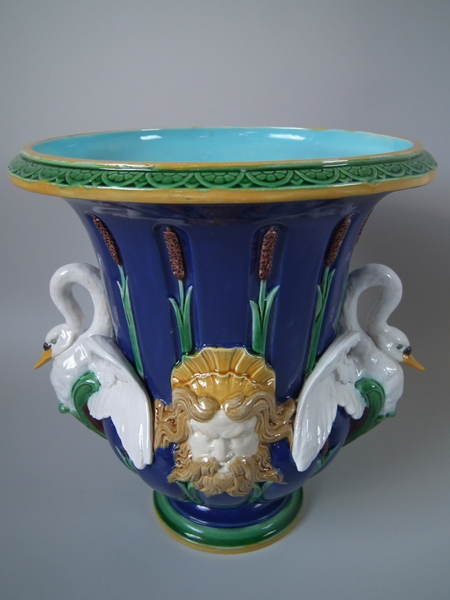
Vase, plain and colored lead glazes on buff biscuit, mixture of Revivalist styles

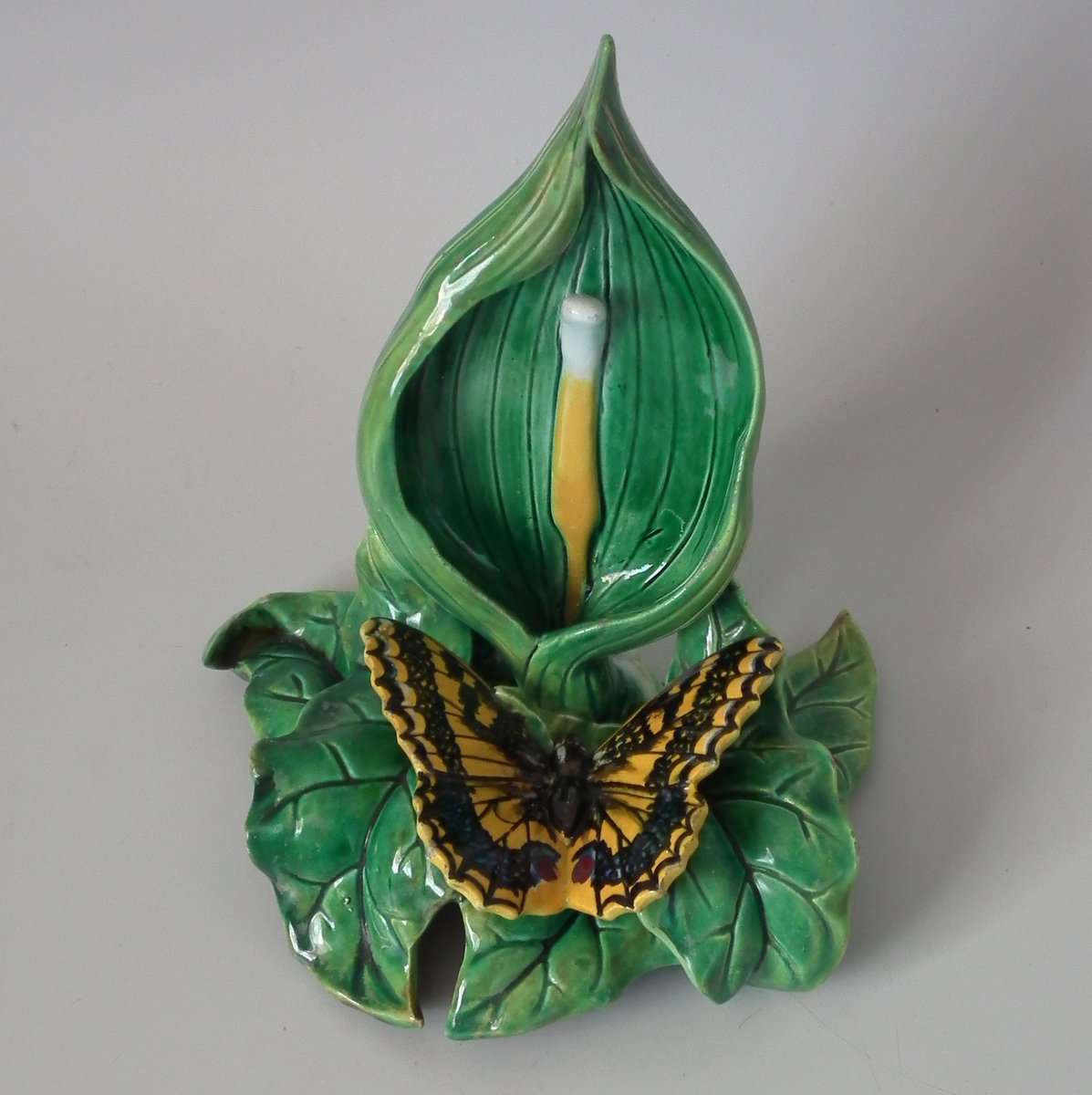
Watch stand for ladies dressing table set, coloured glazes, c. 1874, naturalistic style

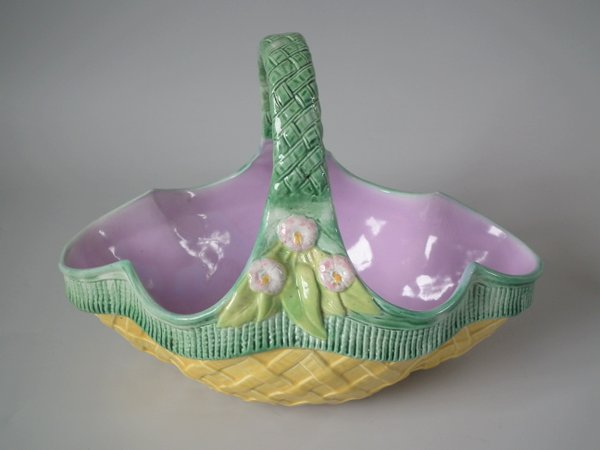
Basket, coloured glazes majolica, 10.2 in, c. 1875, naturalistic in style

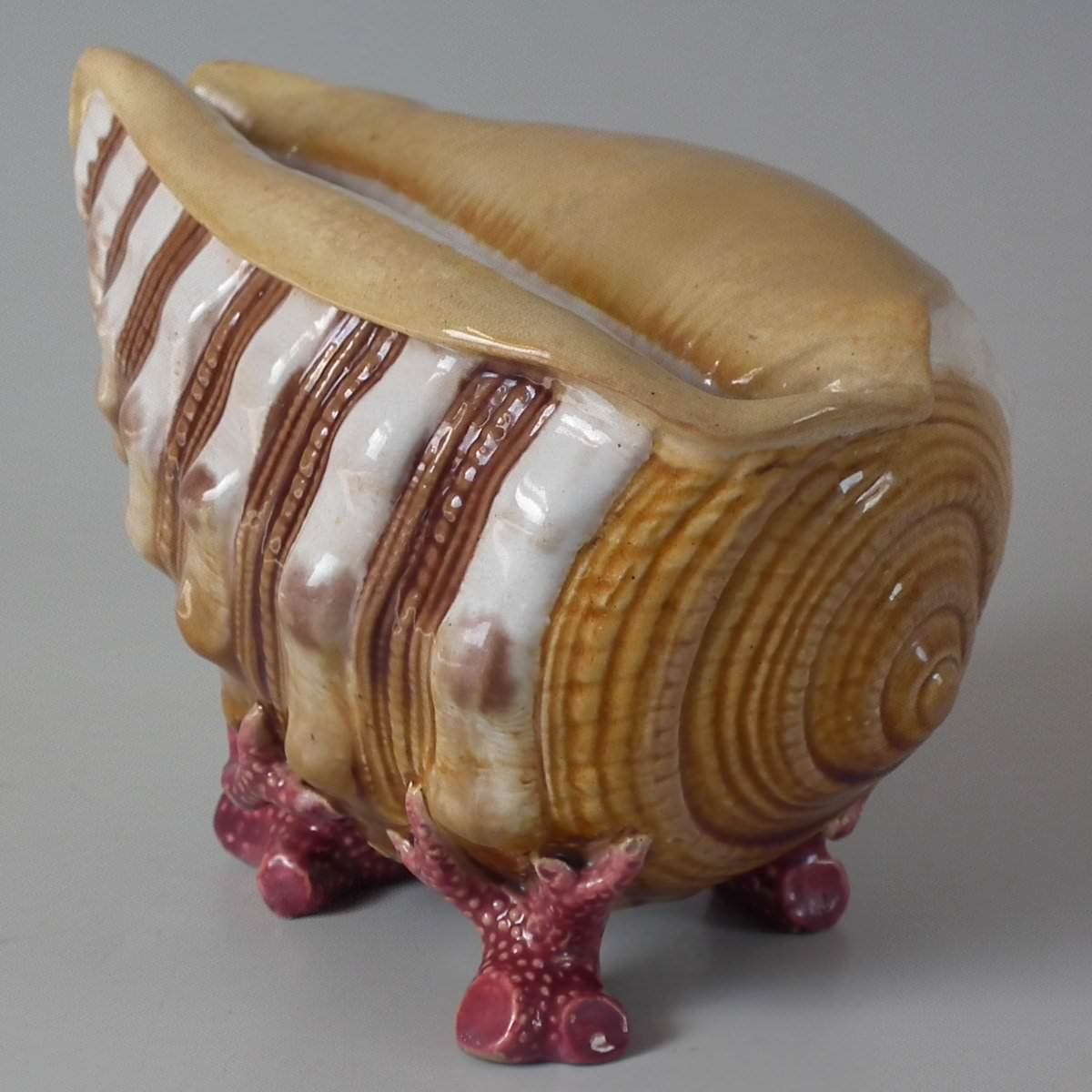
Spoon Warmer, coloured glazes majolica, 1876, ultra naturalistic in style

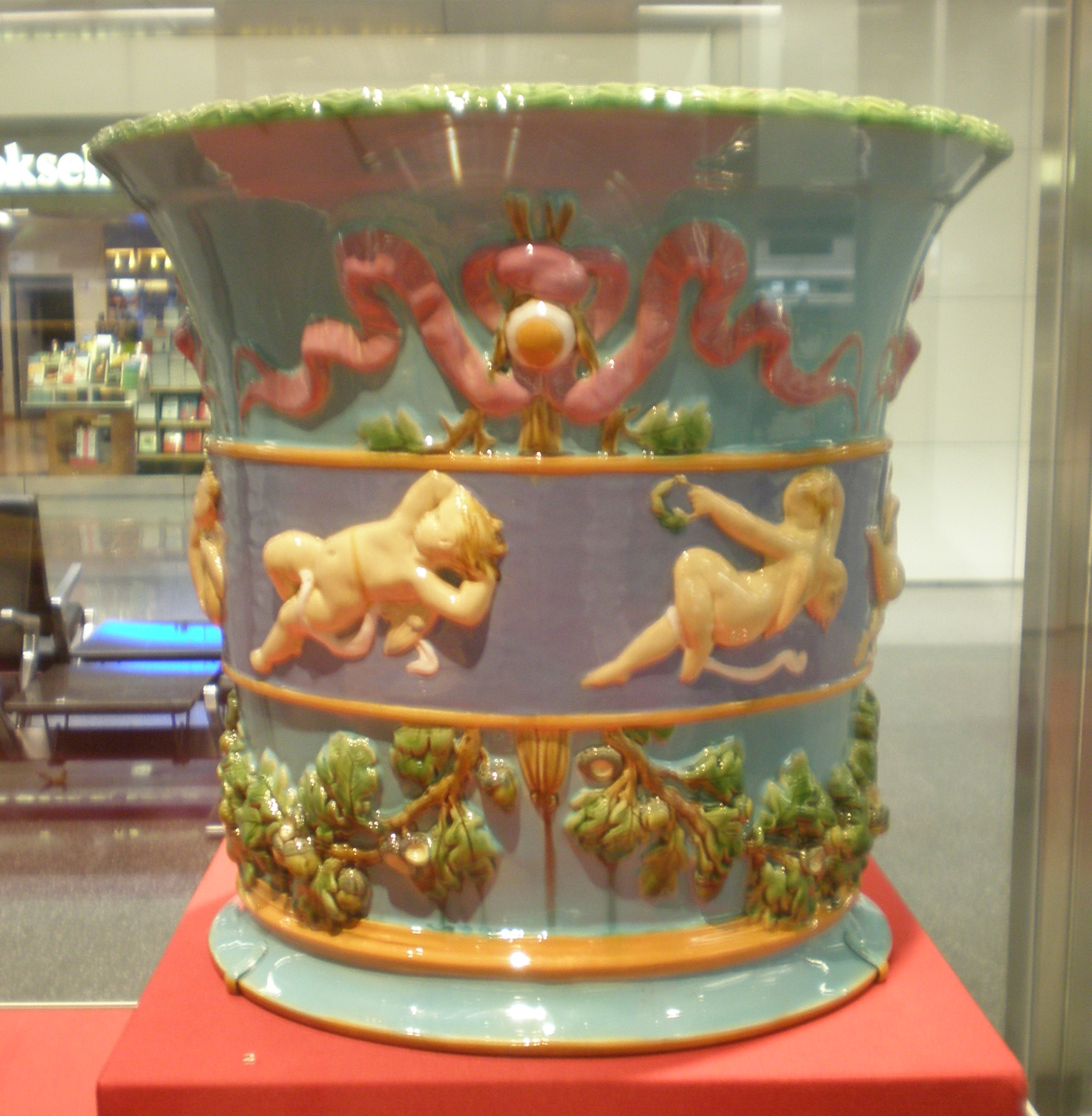
Jardinière (flower pot), coloured lead glazes, Revivalist style(s)

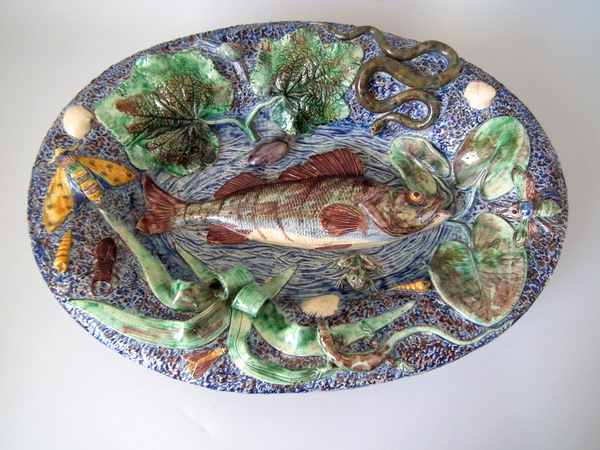
Wall plate, c. 1890, coloured lead glazes Palissy majolica, Barbizet, France, ultra-naturalistic in style

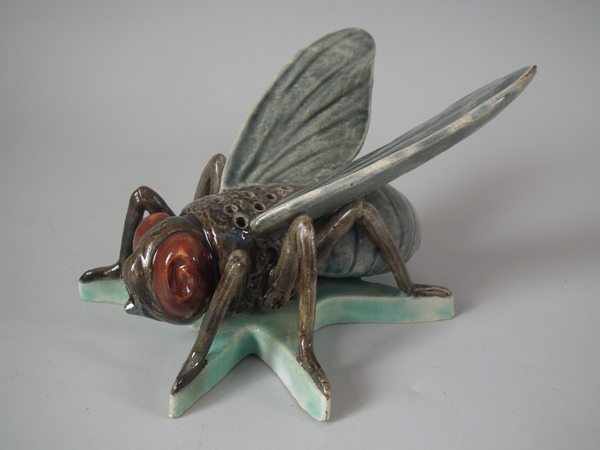
Toothpick holder, 5.5 in, coloured glazes, Palissy style, Portugal

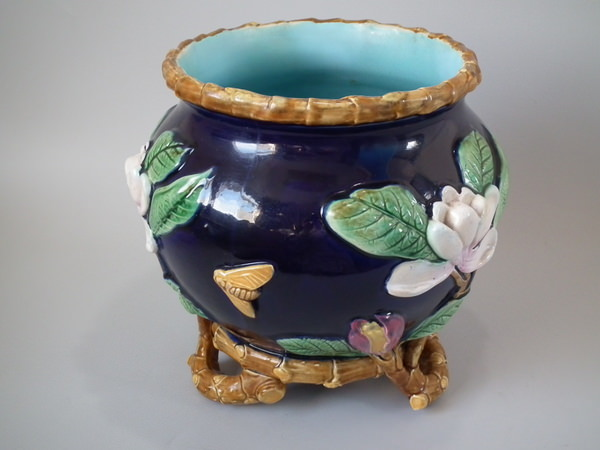
Flower pot, coloured lead glazes on biscuit, naturalistic in style

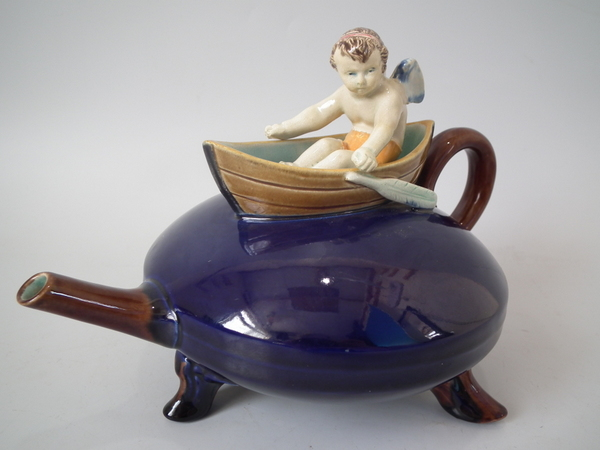
Teapot, c. 1875, coloured lead glazes on biscuit, Japanese style with an element of whimsy

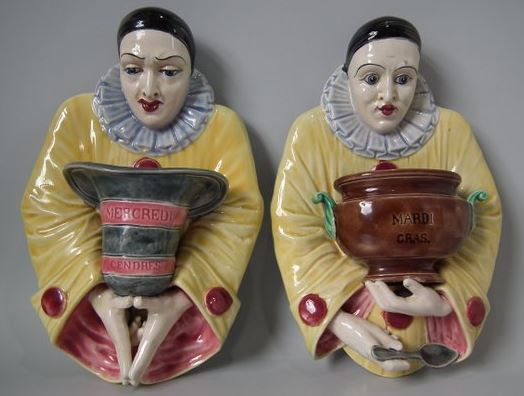
Wall Pockets, coloured glazes majolica, c. 1900, Sarreguemines, France

=== Tin-glaze ===
majolica n. 2. is earthenware, coated with opaque white tin-glaze and ornamented with metallic oxide colours. Tin-glazed Victorian majolica is the rare tin-glazed earthenware made primarily by Mintons from 1848 to circa 1880, typically with flat surfaces, and opaque whitish glaze with brush painted decoration in the style(s) of Italian Renaissance maiolica tin-glazed pottery. Also known as: maiolica; and 'lead or tin' glazed majolica.

Minton's tin-glazed majolica in imitation of Italian maiolica, praised at Exhibitions and purchased by Royalty and museums, made little commercial impact. Other pottery makers shunned the process.

Interest in Renaissance styles was waning, fashion moving on with the usual protestations from older generations: "...the current of fashion, however contrary to right, wisdom, and good taste..."

Cost of production was high. Compared to the lead-glaze process whereby thick, temperature-compatible coloured lead glazes were applied direct to the biscuit, simultaneously, then fired, (paint, fire), the tin-glaze process required extra stages for dipping/coating and drying the tin-glaze before decoration could even begin, (dip, dry, paint, fire). Added to this, the expense of brushwork decoration, especially the fine painting of pictures and designs, was very time-consuming, requiring highly skilled, higher paid artists.

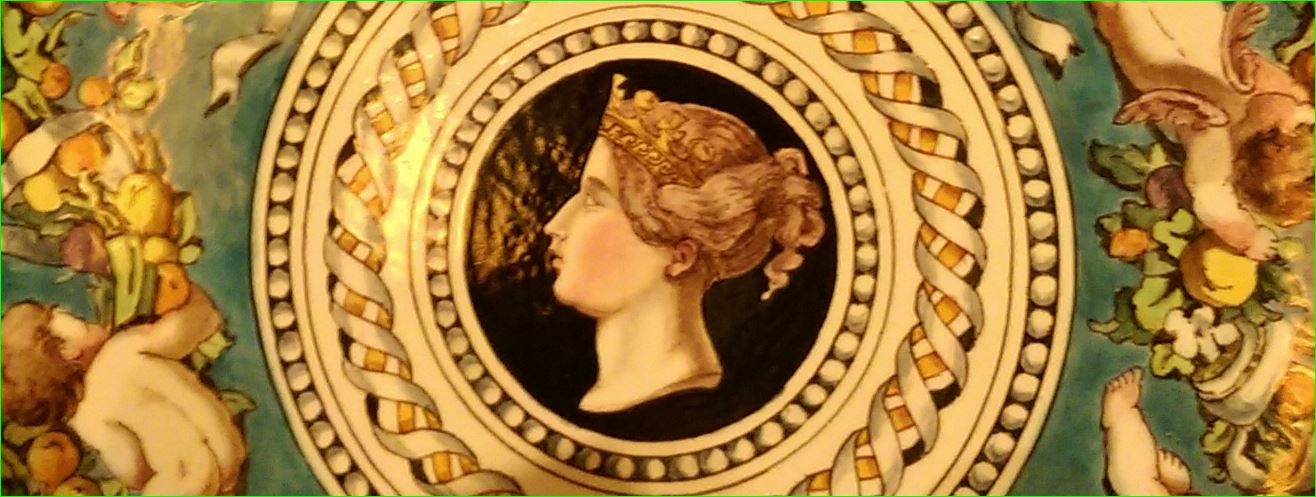
Minton tin-glazed Majolica plate, imitating tin-glazed Italian Renaissance maiolica process and style.

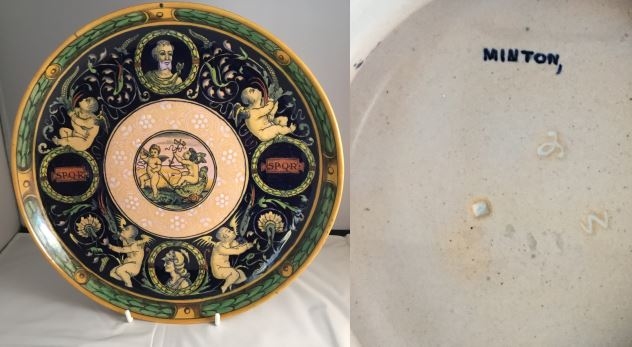
Minton tin-glazed Majolica bowl, 10.4ins, design an exact copy of Renaissance 9.4ins original in V&A, flat surfaces, white glaze, brush painted.

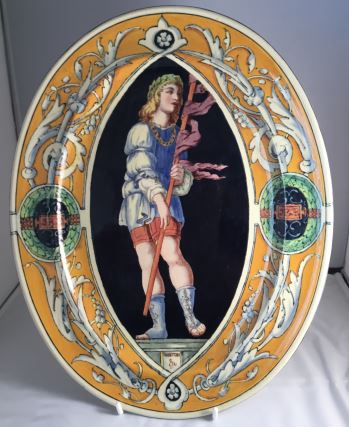
Minton tin-glazed Majolica oval plate, painting by Kirkby, after Triumphs of Caesar (Mantegna). Almost identical example in V&A.

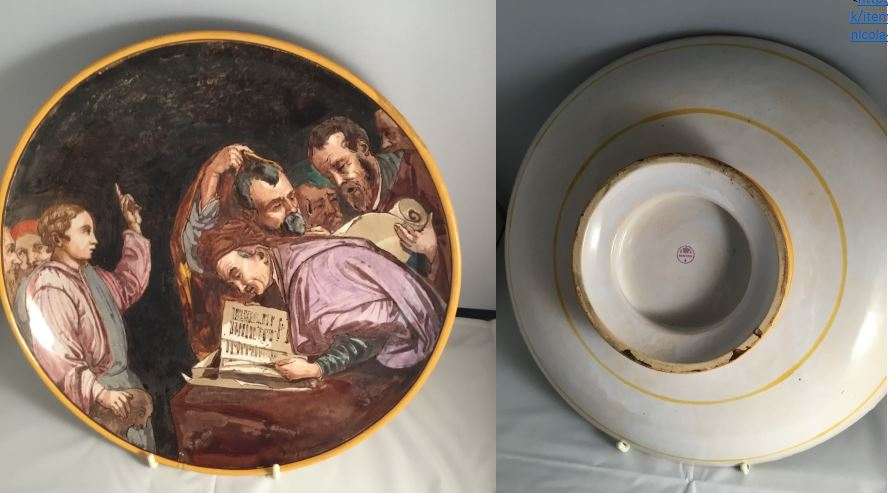
Minton tin-glazed Majolica tondino, istoriato style depicting 'Jesus among the Scribes', signed E Lessore.

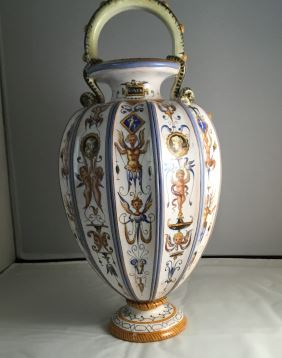
Minton tin-glazed Majolica vase, 'grotesque' Renaissance style, 'MINTON' to the neck, mostly flat surfaces, opaque white glaze, brush painted.

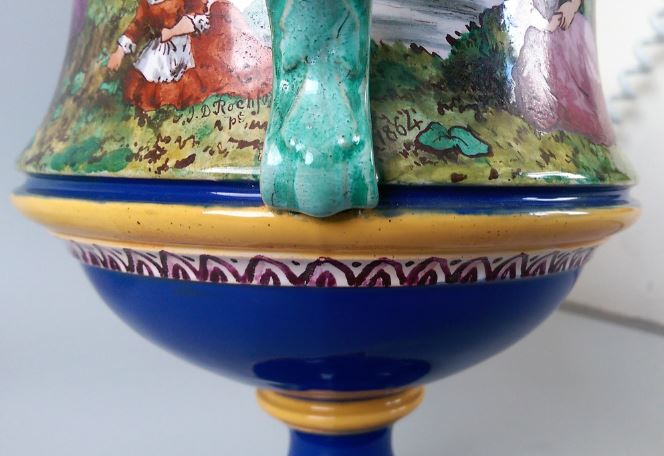
Minton tin-glazed majolica, impressed date cypher 1864, brush-painted with enamels.

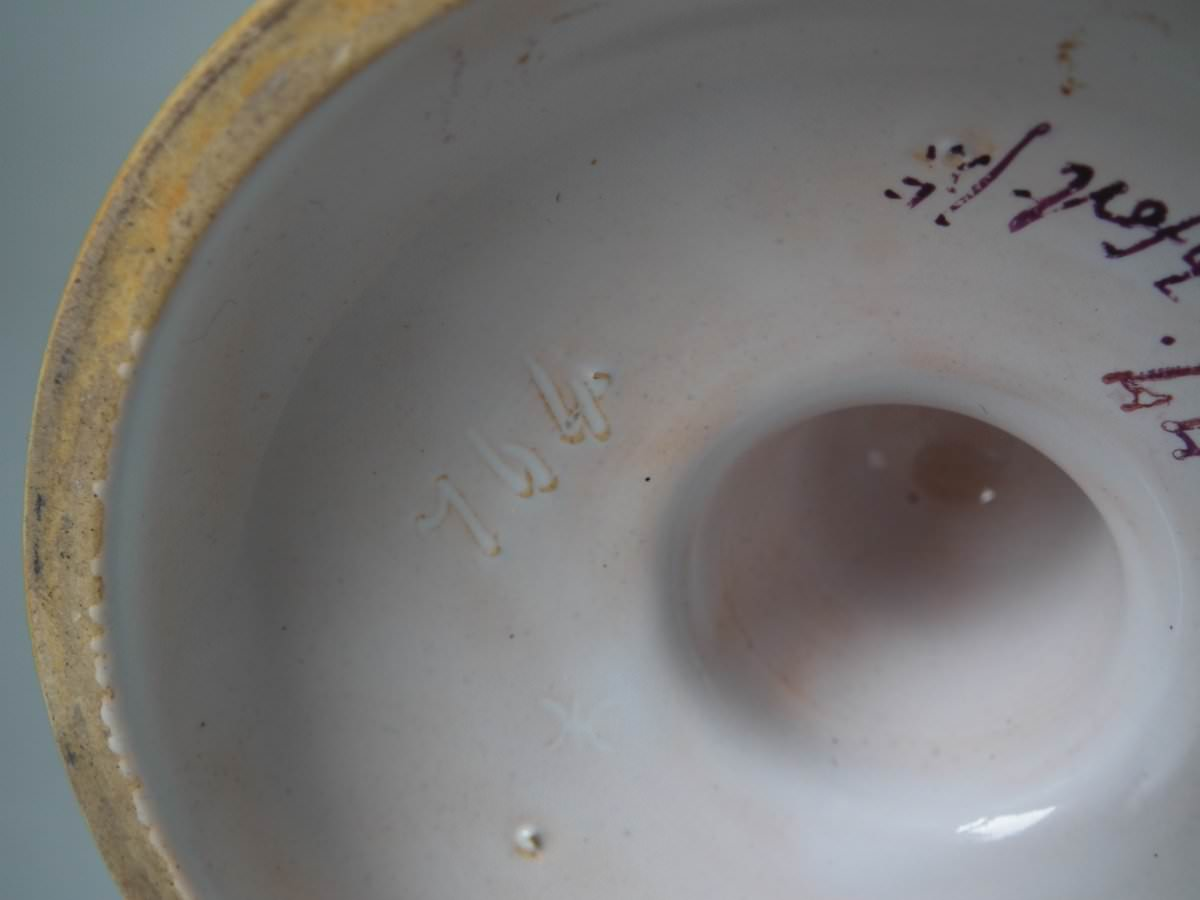
Tin-glazed Minton majolica, base. Note coated not dipped, date cypher 1864, signature brush-painted in manganese oxide.

== Meanings of majolica ==
The term majolica has been dogged by confusion starting with the English anglicisation of the word maiolica into majolica following the appearance of the letter j in the English alphabet mid-17th century.

Leon Arnoux, the artistic and technical director of Mintons, wrote in 1852 "We understand by majolica a pottery formed of a calcareous clay gently fired, and covered with an opaque enamel composed of sand, lead, and tin..." He was describing the Minton & Co. tin-glazed product made in imitation of Italian maiolica both in process and in styles. Remember, tin-glaze is simply plain lead glaze with a little tin oxide added. His description is often referenced, in error, as a definition of Minton's other new product, the much copied and later mass-produced ceramic sensation of the Victorian era, Minton's coloured lead glazes 'Palissy ware'. The 16th-century French pottery of Bernard Palissy was well known and much admired. Mintons adopted the name 'Palissy ware' for their new coloured glazes product, but this soon became known also as majolica. Minton & Co. appear to have done little to promote the clear distinction between their tin-glazed and coloured glazes products.

=== Minton archive first design for majolica ===
Thomas Kirkby's design G144 in the Minton Archive is inscribed "This is the First Design for Majolica ...". The design is Italian Renaissance in style. Close-up images illustrate a design suited for fine brushwork on flat surfaces. The design is for Minton's rare tin-glaze Majolica imitation of Italian tin-glaze maiolica. Minton's designs for Palissy ware, also known as majolica, were suited for 'thick' painting of coloured lead glazes onto surfaces moulded in relief to make best use of the intaglio effect.

== English makers ==
=== Minton, the originator ===
==== Great Exhibition (1851) ====
Victorian majolica was originated by Minton & Co., first exhibited at the Great Exhibition of 1851.

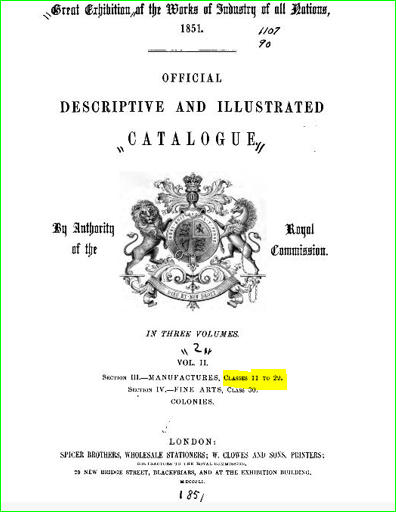
1851 Great Exhibition London, Catalogue Cover

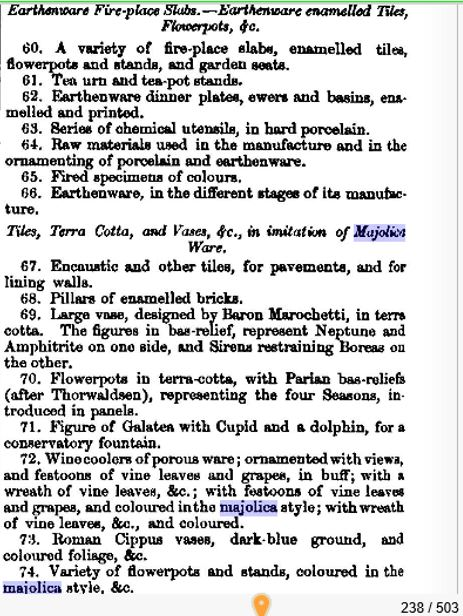
1851 Exhibition Catalogue, Minton Exhibit Numbers 60 to 74. Majolica refers to Renaissance Italian maiolica.

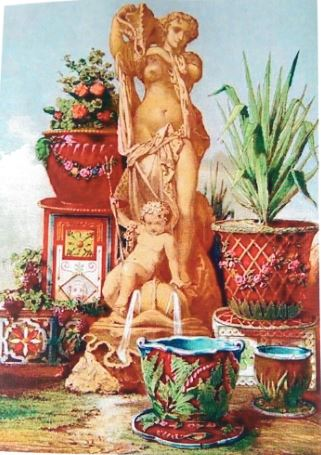
Lithograph illustrating flower pots, and stands (underplates) and garden seats, see Exhibit Number 60.

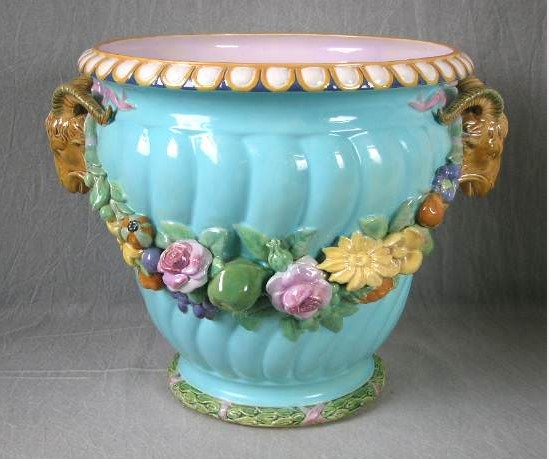
Minton Palissy ware/majolica flower vase, coloured glazes, shape first shown at the 1851 Exhibition, Exhibit Number 60

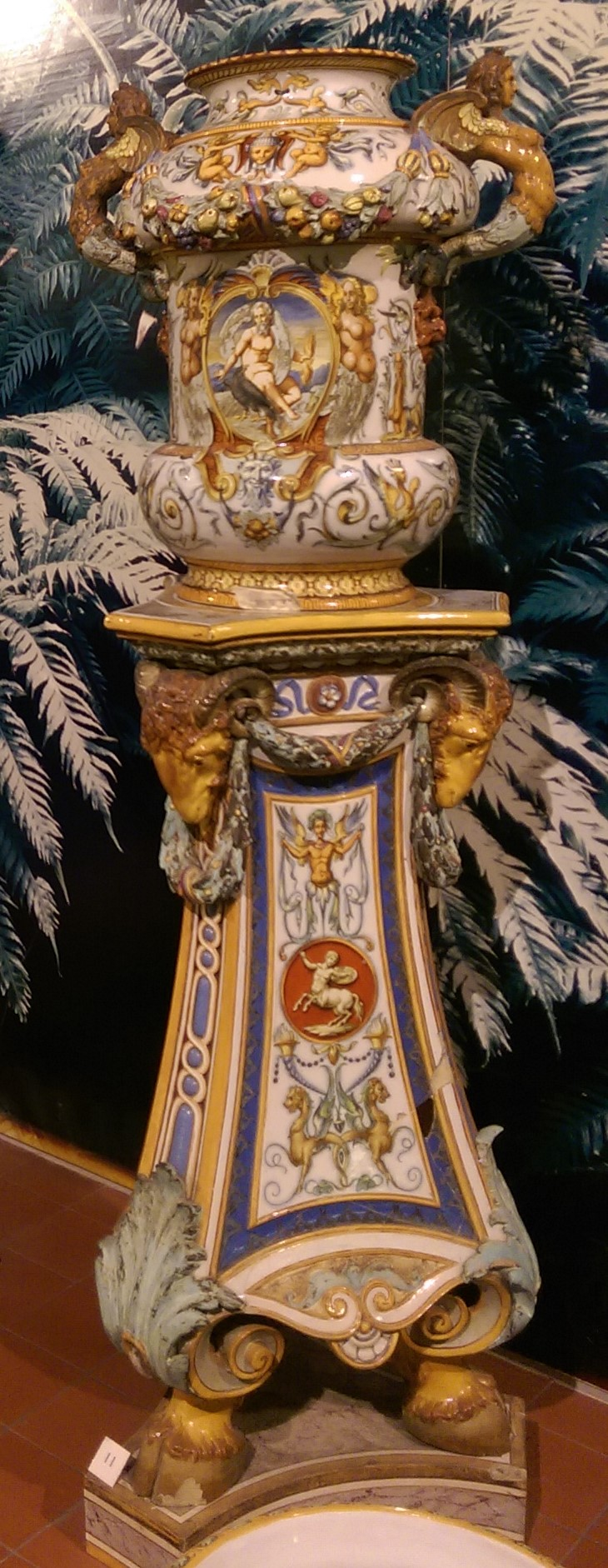
Minton tin-glazed Majolica flower pot and stand (pedestal) in Italian Renaissance maiolica Grotesque style, see Exhibit Number 74

The 1851 Exhibition Catalogue lists the two Victorian majolica products by Minton in consecutive sections.

Earthenware [...] Flowerpots, etc. Exhibit Number 60. "A variety of [...] flowerpots and stands, and garden seats." refers to the coloured glazes product that Mintons called Palissy ware.

Tiles, Terra Cotta, and Vases, etc, in imitation of Majolica Ware. Exhibit Number 74. "Variety of flowerpots and stands, coloured in the majolica style, etc." refers to the tin-glazed product painted with enamels that Mintons called Majolica.

==== Exposition Universelle (1855) ====
The Illustrated London News reported with approval on Minton's two new products shown at the Exposition Universelle in Paris:

The collection of Palissy and Majolica ware, however, is that which appears to have created the greatest sensation among Parisian connoisseurs. The reader will remember that the main difference in these wares is that whereas the Palissy ware is coloured by a transparent glaze, Majolica ware contains the colour (opaque) in the material. The care and taste with which these manufactures have been brought by the Messrs. Minton to their present state of perfection, have been amply rewarded. Within a few days of the opening of the Exhibition all the specimens exhibited had been sold.

Despite this reminder Minton's Palissy Ware became known as 'majolica ware'; 'Palissy ware' dropped out of use and 'majolica' stuck. In the 1870s, the curators of the South Kensington Museum (now the V&A) tried to clear up the confusion by reviving the Italian spelling 'maiolica' with an 'i' instead of a 'j' for Italian tin-glaze.

==== Great Exhibition (1862) ====
At the second Great Exhibition of the Art-Works of All Nations a range of Minton's products were exhibited and illustrated in the Exhibition Catalogue. Amongst them were the two Minton majolicas a) tin-glazed Minton Majolica and b) coloured glazes Minton Palissy ware soon known also as 'majolica'.

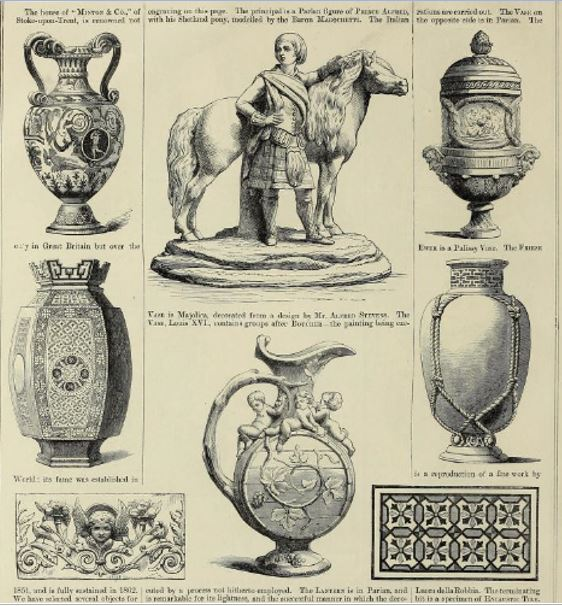
1862 Exhibition Minton exhibits, top left "The Italian vase is Majolica, decorated from a design by Mr. ALFRED STEVENS.", bottom middle "The EWER is a Palissy Vase."

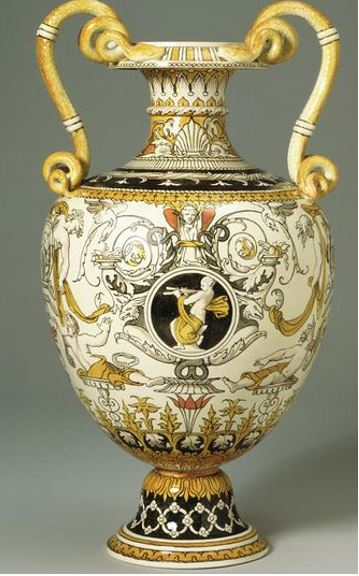
Minton Majolica vase, 1862 Exhibition, process and style in imitation of Italian Renaissance maiolica. Victoria and Albert Museum, London

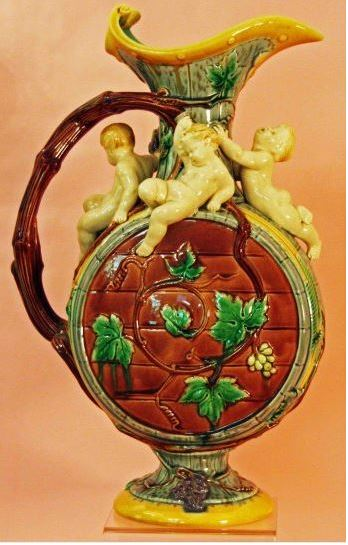
Minton Palissy ware ewer, 1862 Exhibition, process coloured glazes majolica, style Renaissance with a touch of naturalistic
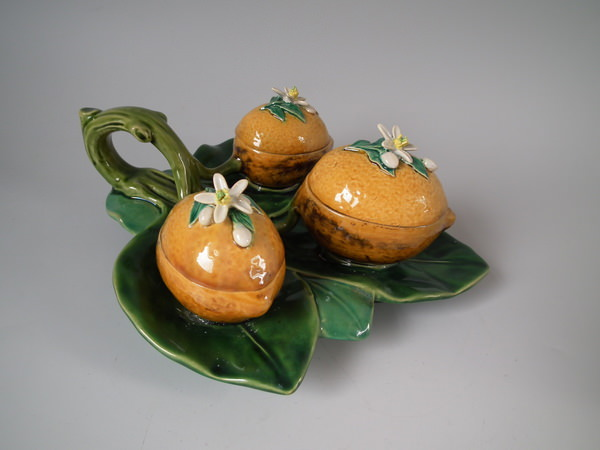
Inkstand, 1860, coloured glazes, naturalistic style

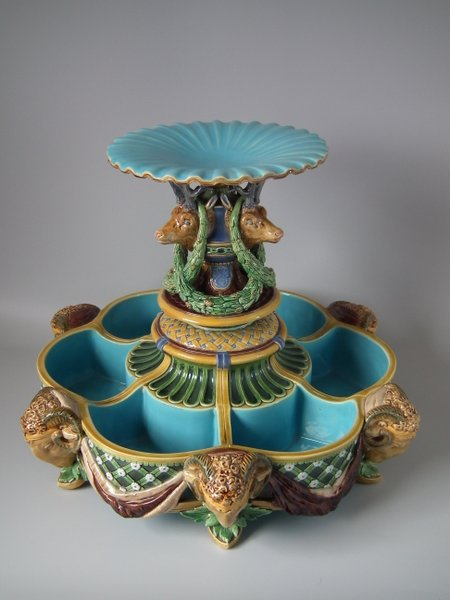
Ice stand table centre, 1860, coloured glazes, Revivalist style

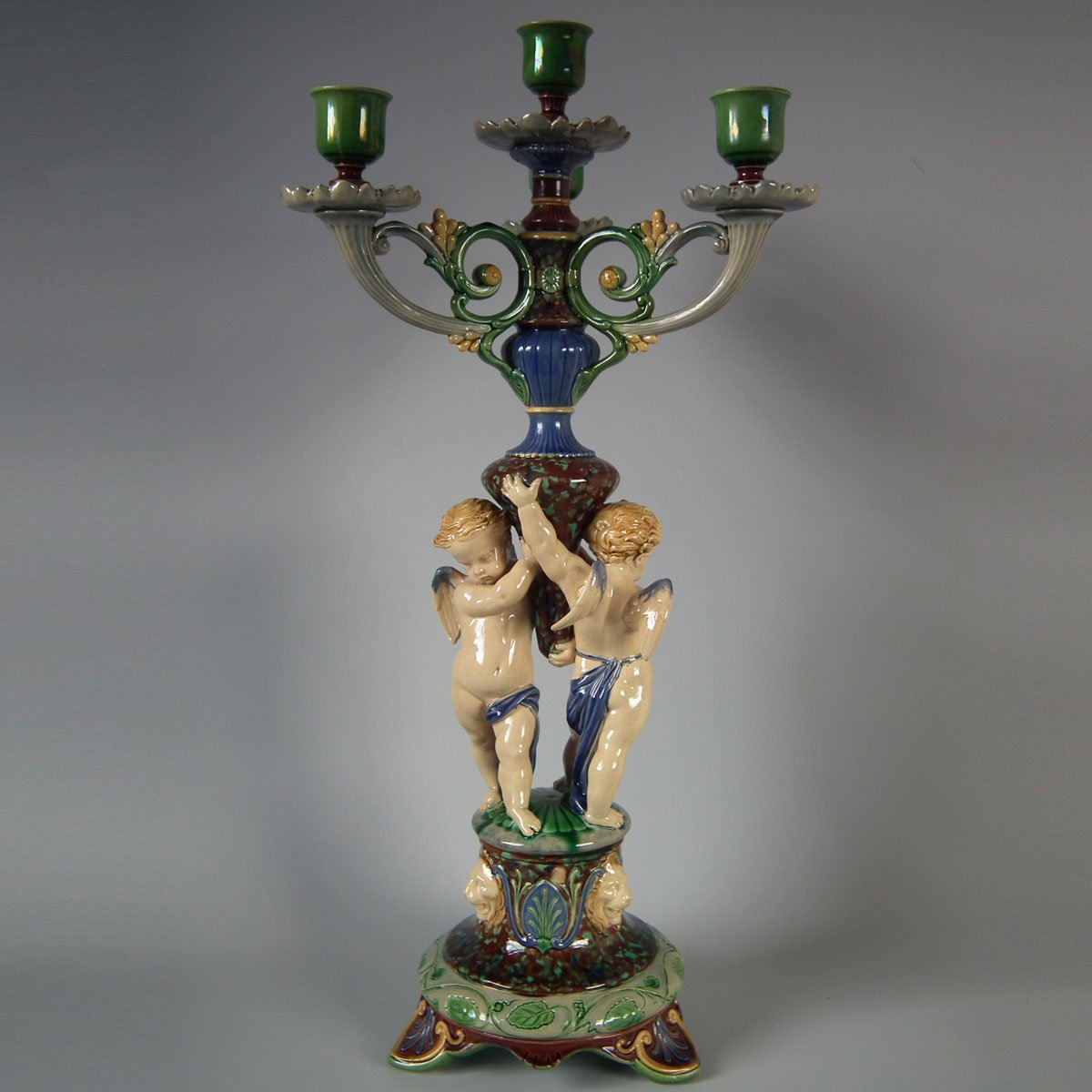
Minton Candelabra, 1860, coloured, mottled, and plain glazes, Revivalist style

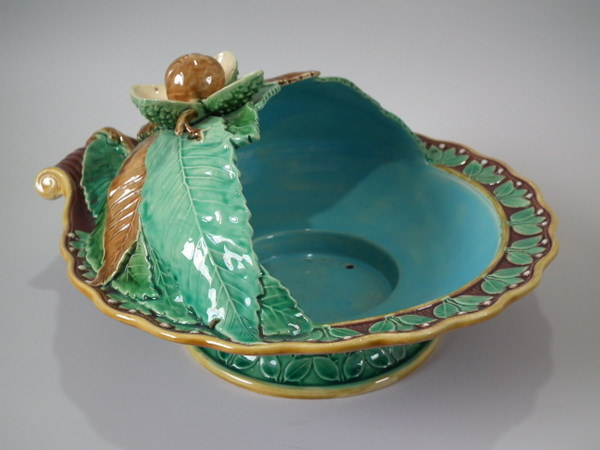
Chestnut server, 1865, 11 in, coloured glazes, naturalistic in style

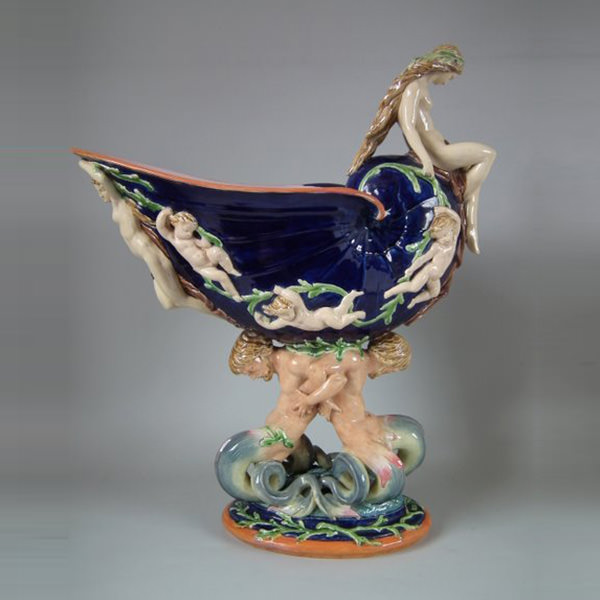
Nautilus shell centrepiece, 1865, coloured glazes, Revivalist style

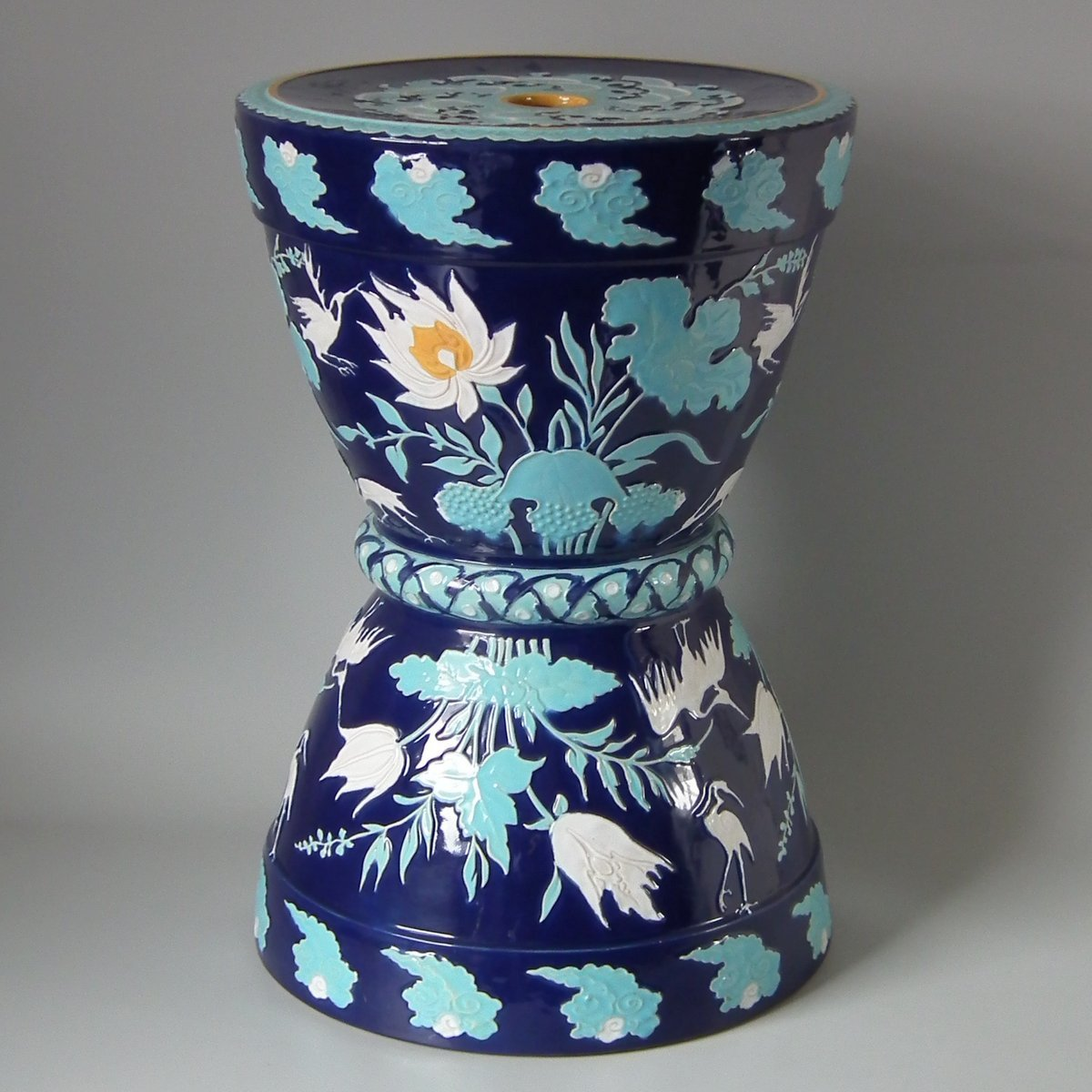
Garden Seat, 18.1 in, coloured glazes, Chinoiserie in style, 1866

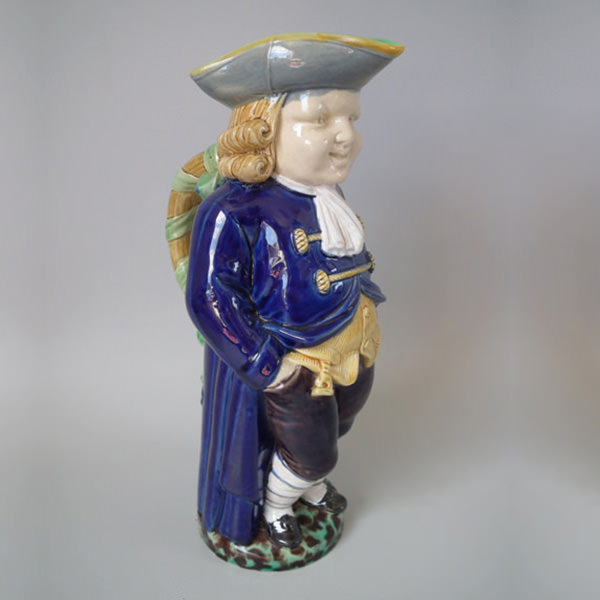
'Quaker man' toby jug, 1867

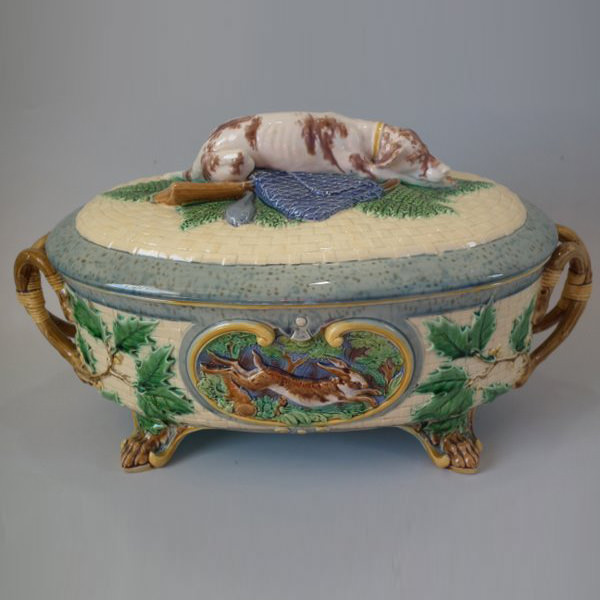
Gun dog Game Pie Dish, 17.3 in, coloured and mottled glazes, naturalistic in style

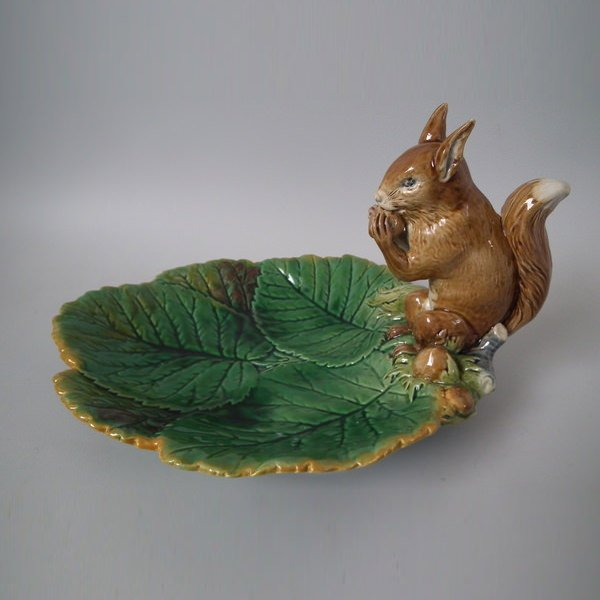
Nut dish, 1869, naturalistic style

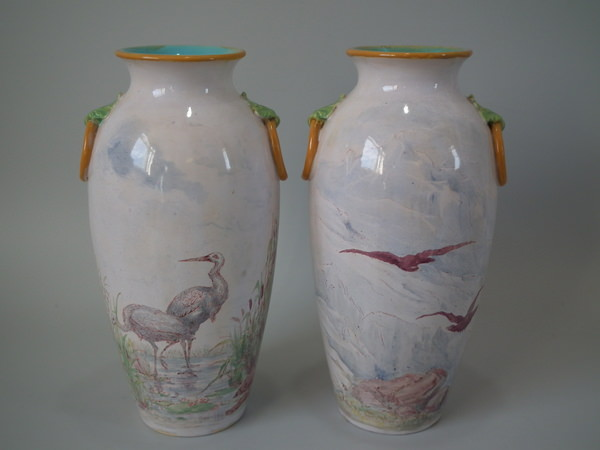
Vases, 1869, rare combination of fine-painted tin-glaze and coloured glazes handles, rim and interior

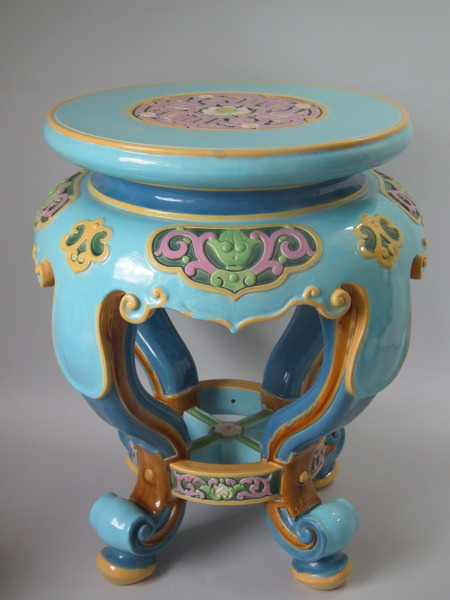
Garden Seat, 1870, 20 in, coloured glazes, Revivalist motifs

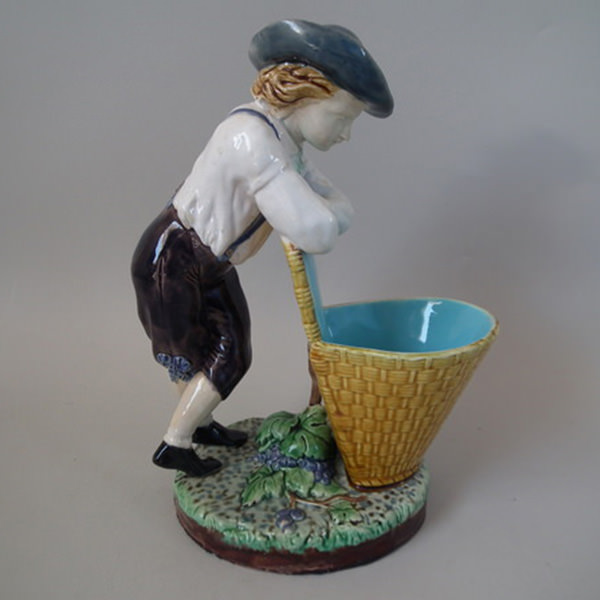
Vintager figural, 1870

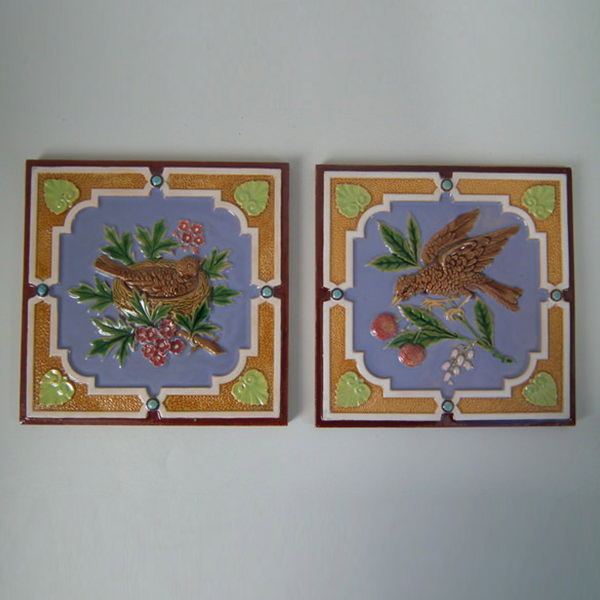
Tiles, c. 1870, coloured glazes, naturalistic in style

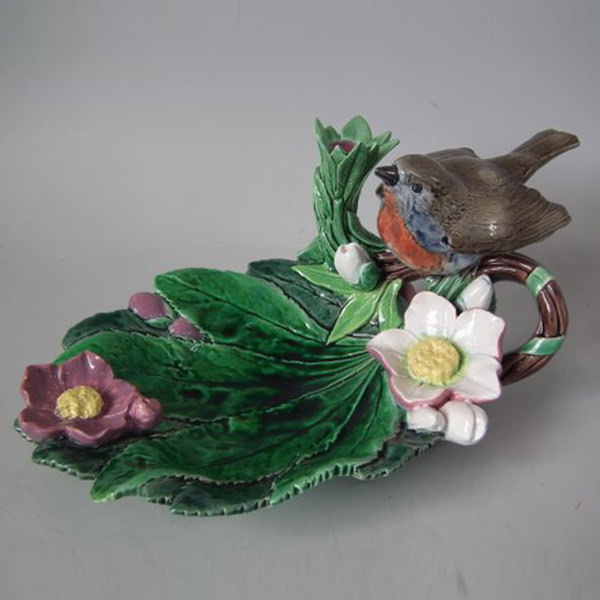
Candle Holder, 1870, coloured glazes, naturalistic in style

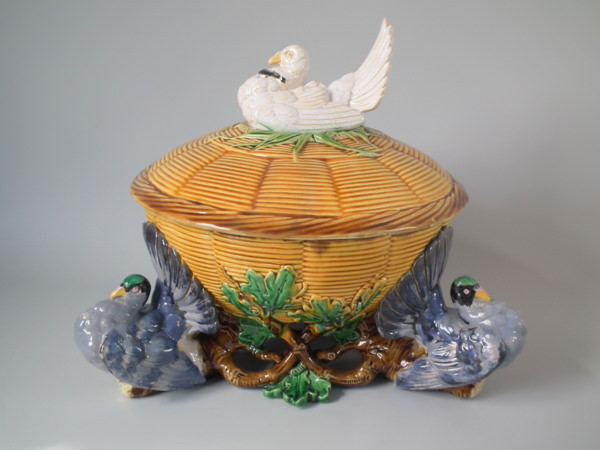
Tureen, 1870, coloured glazes, naturalistic style

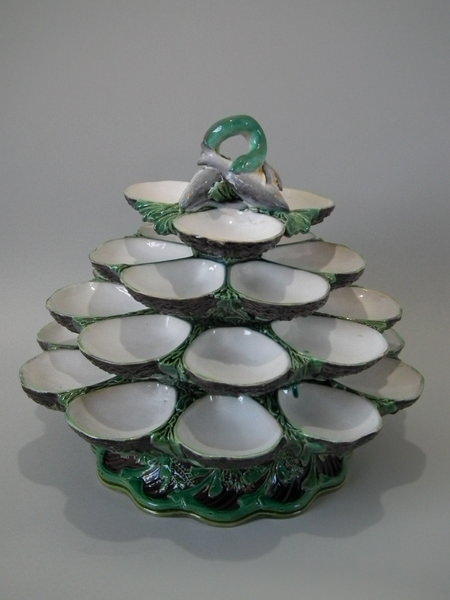
Oyster server, 1870, coloured glazes, Naturalistic style

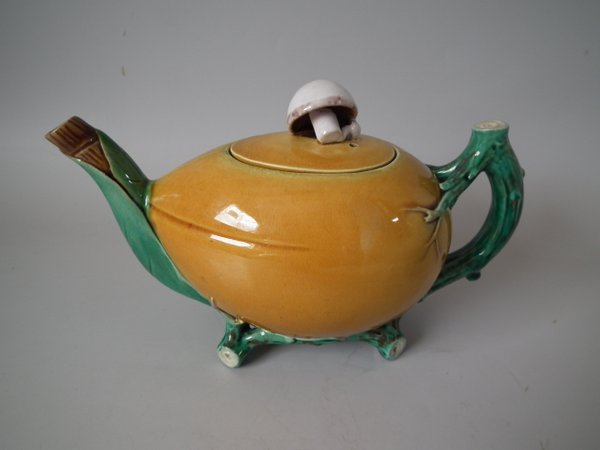
Teapot, coconut, mushroom lid, 1872, coloured glazes, naturalistic style with hint of whimsy

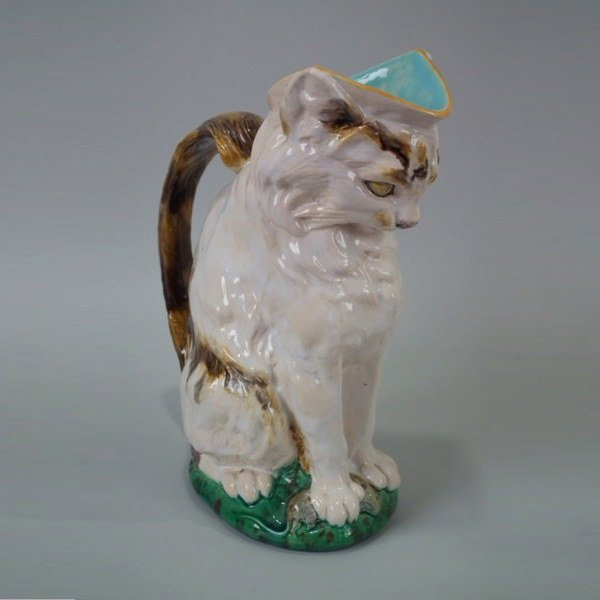
Cat and mouse jug, 1875, naturalistic style

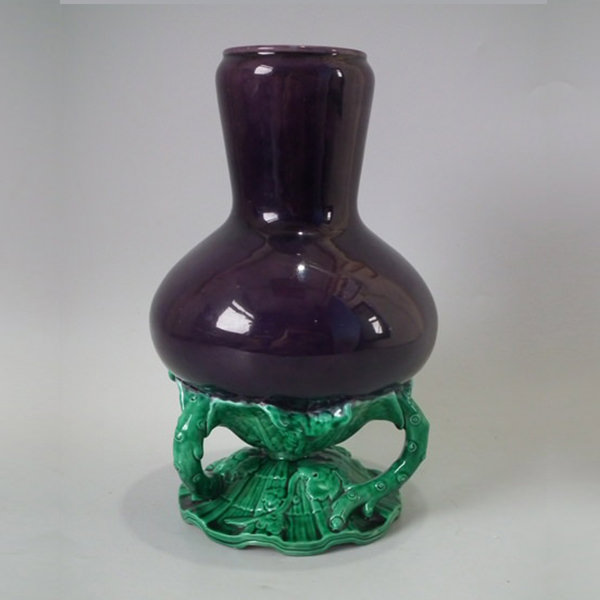
Eggplant-Aubergine vase, 1875, naturalistic style

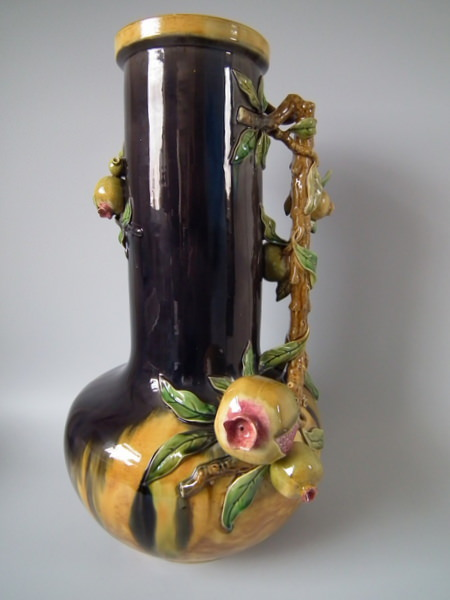
Pomegranate Vase, 1878, 22 in, coloured glazes, boldly decorative, naturalistic and humorous in style

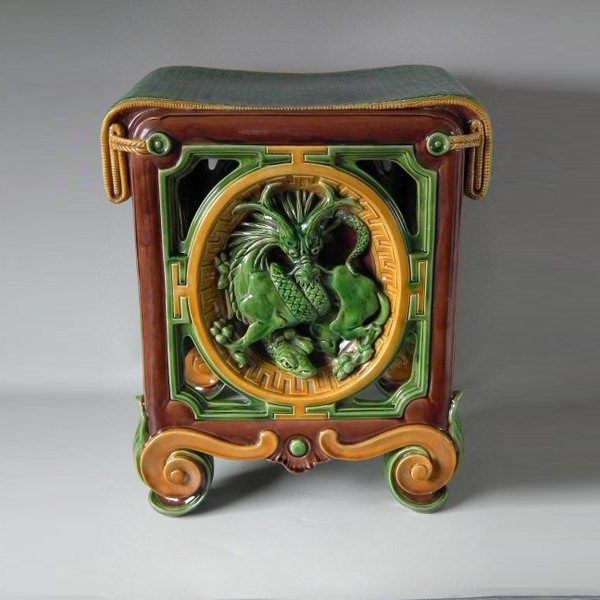
Garden seat, 1880, coloured glazes, in imitation of Tang dynasty sancai

=== Wedgwood ===
Wedgwood began to manufacture majolica about ten years after Mintons. Wedgwood's glazes and modelling were denser and more formal than Minton's, but there were many pieces that displayed the naturalism and humour of Minton shapes. Wedgwood's majolica included cachepots, jugs, candlesticks, cheese bells, umbrella stands, sardine boxes, plates in naturalistic patterns, bread trays, etc. In Wedgwood's "greenware" the green glaze emphasizes the low relief patterning, typically of basketwork and foliage. Numerous smaller factories in the Staffordshire Potteries specialised in such green majolica wares in which the translucent glaze brought out the low relief of the cast body: some, like Wedgwood, marked their majolica with impressed stamps.

Majolica was influenced by the design of the old "Cauliflower" and "Pineapple" teapots that had been made by Thomas Whieldon, Wedgwood and other 18th-century Staffordshire potters. Both English and American majolica potters reproduced the "Cauliflower" pattern and other raised fruit, vegetable, leaf, and berry patterns, with green, yellow, pink, brown, light blue and purple-blue glazes. There is also a teapot of yellow corn and green leaves, similar to the old Whieldon "Pineapple" teapots, and a teapot, jug and sugar bowl of pink coral and green seaweed with accents of brown and blue, marked "Etruscan Majolica". Many late 19th-century majolica designs had rustic motifs with backgrounds of basketry and wooden-bound buckets decorated with moulded flowers, birds, fish and animals. Handles were made to resemble tree branches, rose stems and twined flowers and leaves.

Plates, jugs, teapots and other articles were moulded with the shapes of wild roses, lily pads and herons, begonia leaves, shells, coral, seaweed, corn and bamboo stalks, cabbage leaves, strawberries, ferns and sprays of flowers, borders of basketry and oriental motifs.

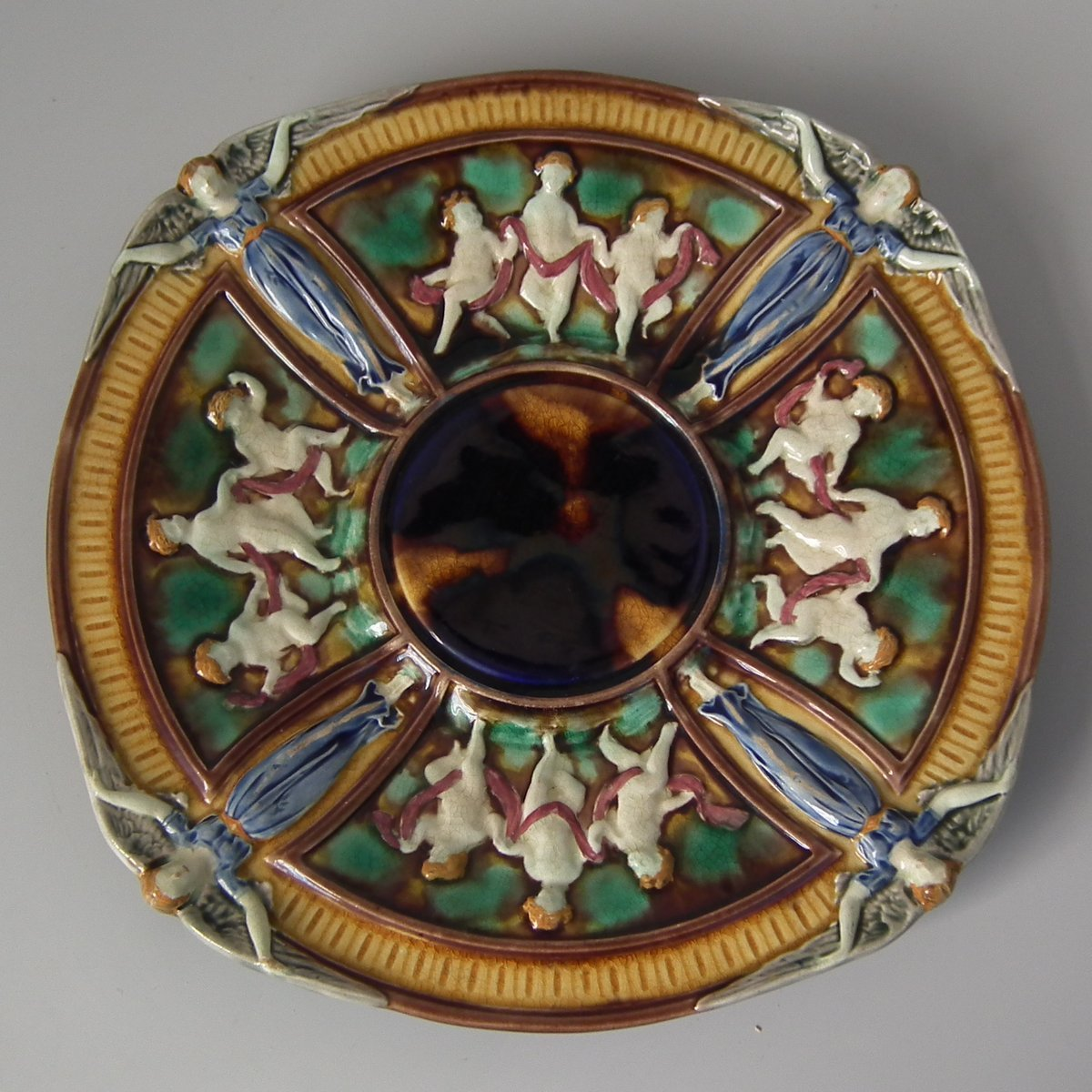
Coloured glazes majolica Angels dessert plate, c. 1867, Revivalist in style

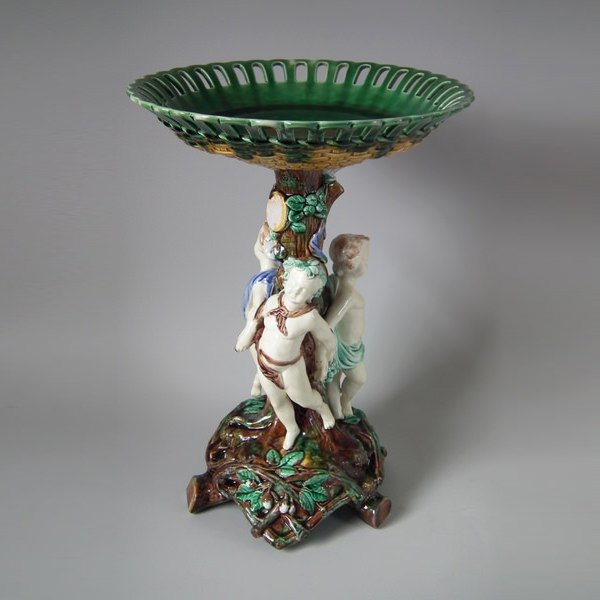
Coloured glazes majolica centrepiece, 16.3 in, c. 1889, Revivalist and naturalistic in style

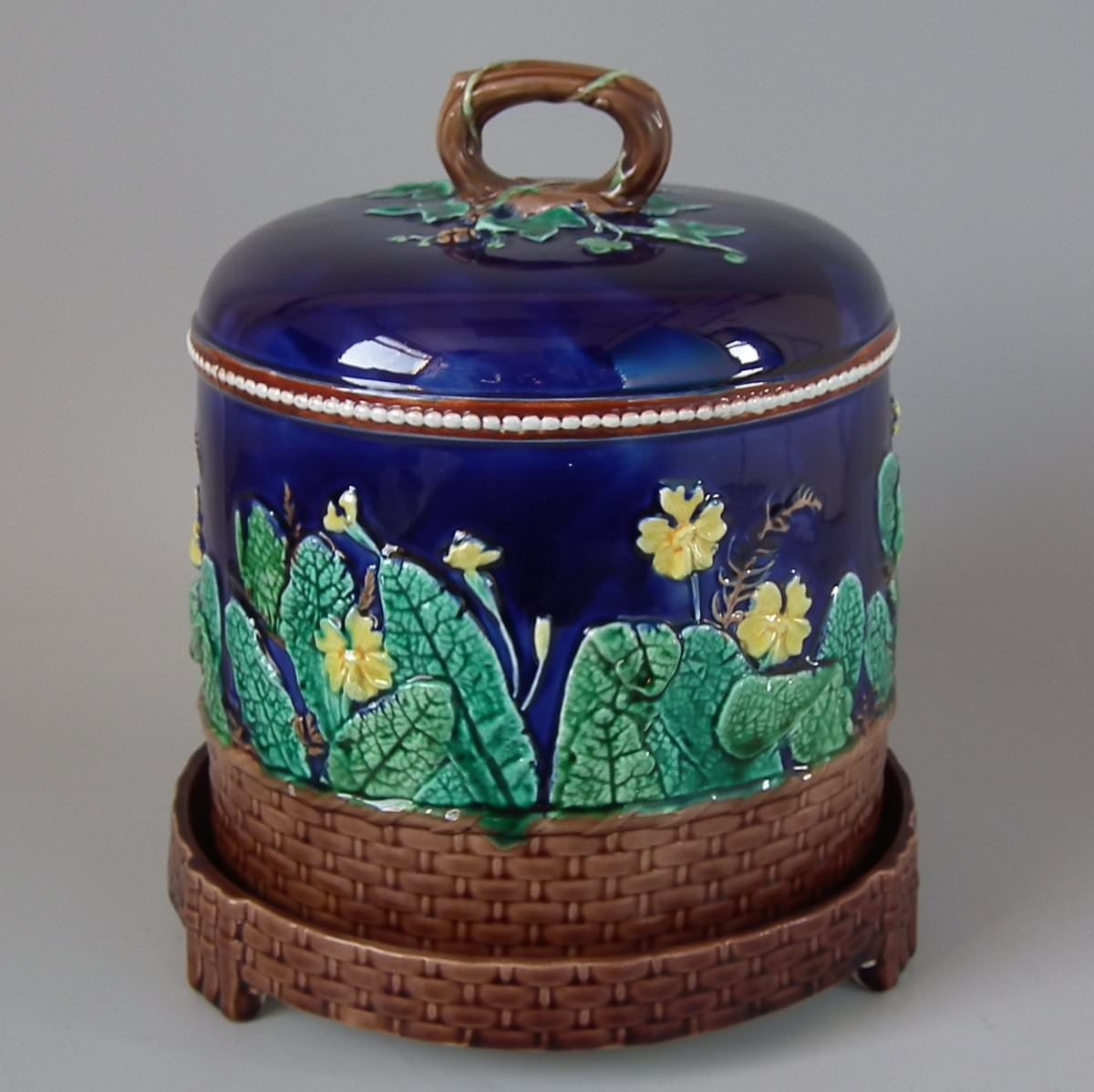
Coloured glazes majolica primroses cheese keep, c. 1876, naturalistic in style

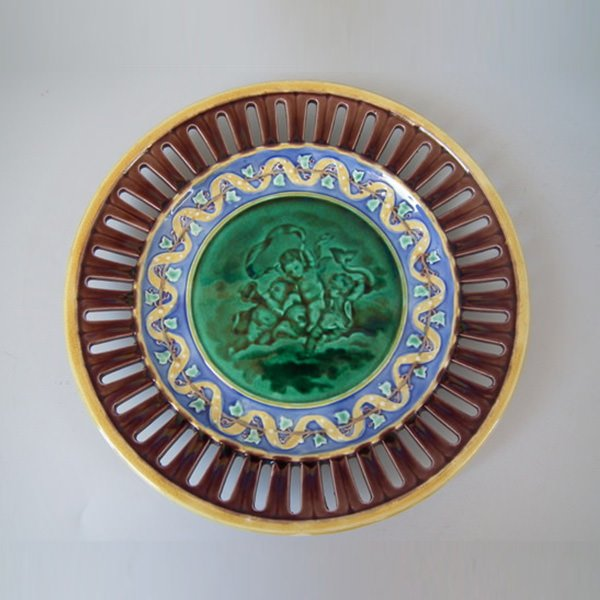
Coloured glazes majolica, intaglio pictorial centre 'Email Ombrant', c. 1871, Classical style

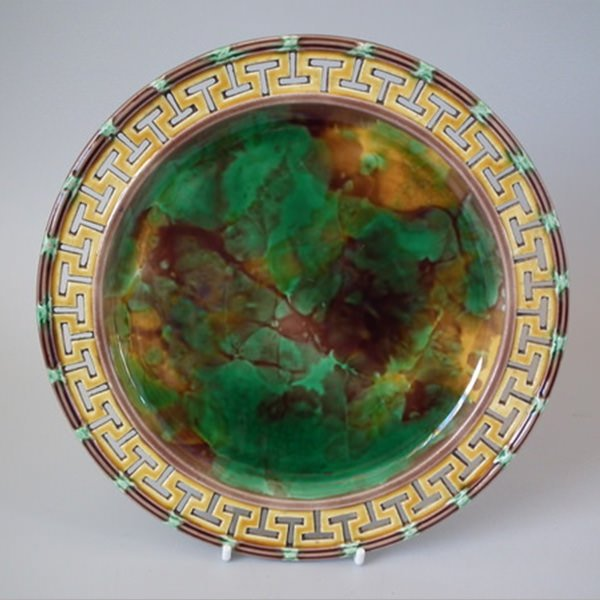
Mottled coloured glazes Victorian majolica, c. 1865, border in Greek key style

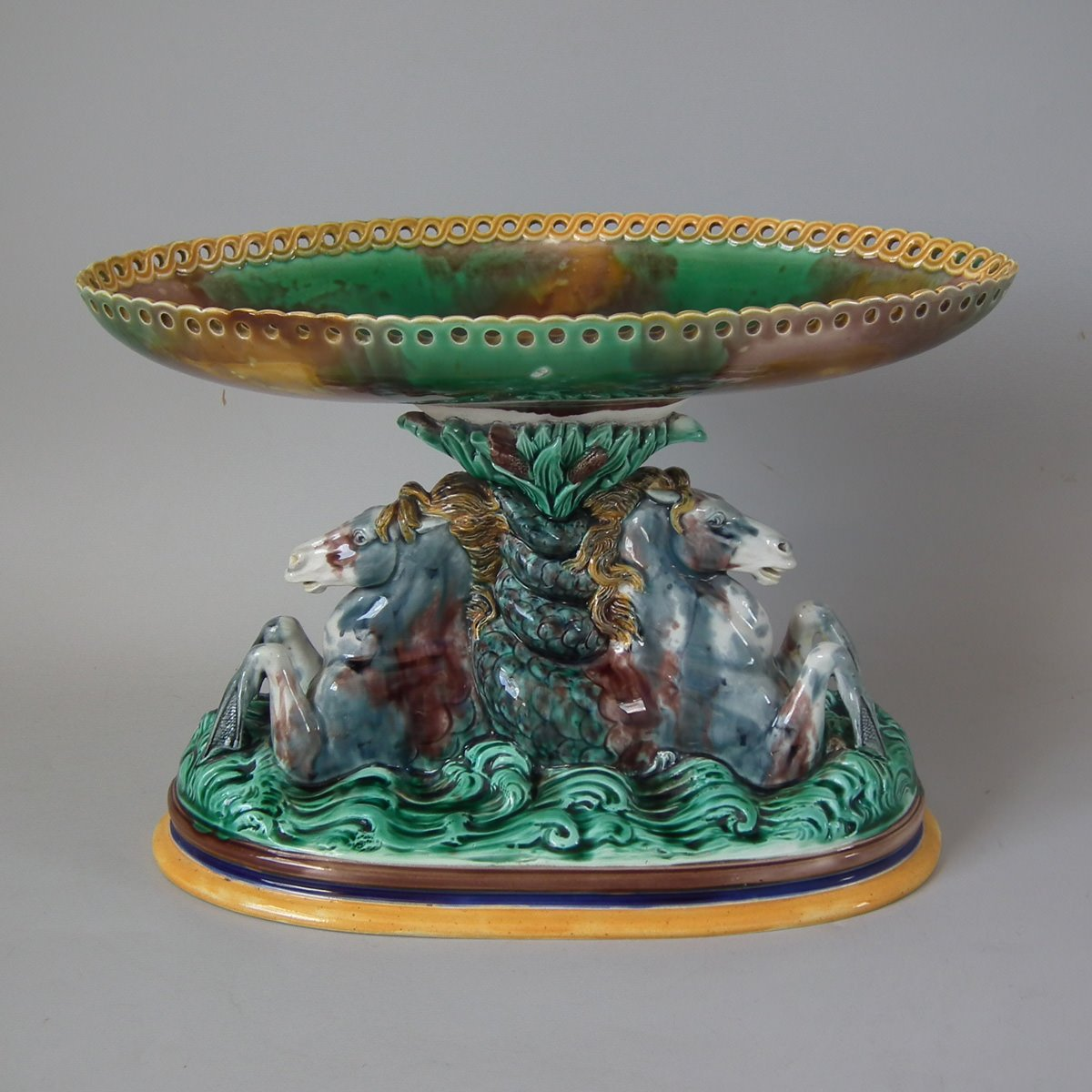
Coloured glazes majolica hippocamp centrepiece, c. 1869, Classical mythology in style

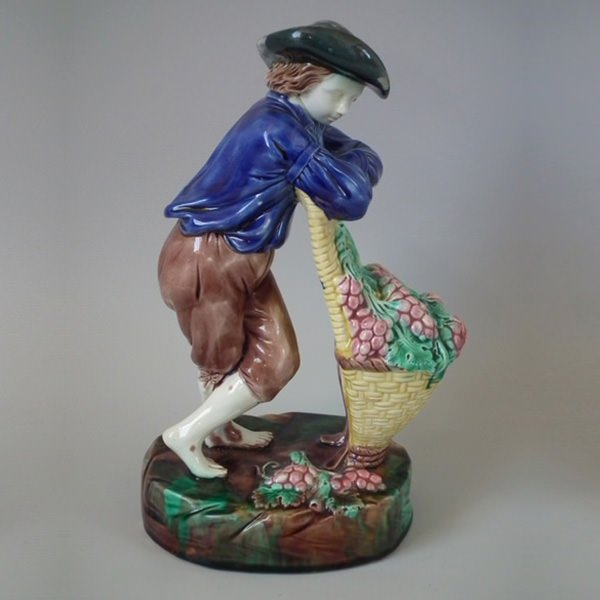
Coloured glazes majolica figural vintager, c. 1875, naturalistic in style

=== George Jones ===
The Trent Pottery, George Jones and Sons, made majolica cupids, shells, dolphins, birds, figurines and coral designs in numerous shapes including highbrow centrepieces alongside snuff boxes, spittoons, dog bowls, vases, serving dishes, tea sets, jugs, cheese keeps, desk sets, garden seats and pie dishes. Their mark was a monogram of the initials "G.J." joined together. A beehive bread dish with a cover has a design of wild roses against a background of basketwork and has the Trent Pottery mark. Flowerpots were made in bright colours and with raised designs of natural flowers.

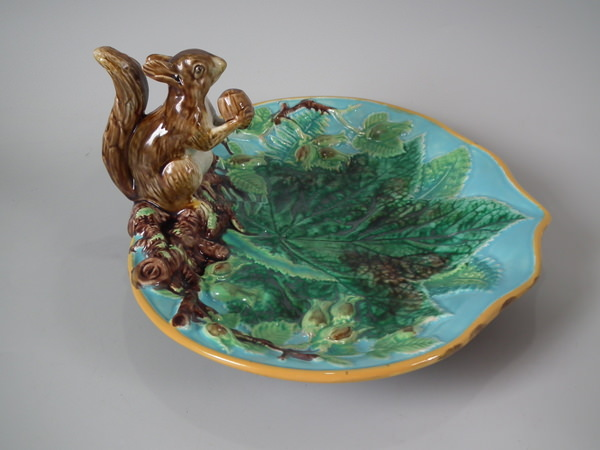
Squirrel nut dish, 1869, naturalistic style

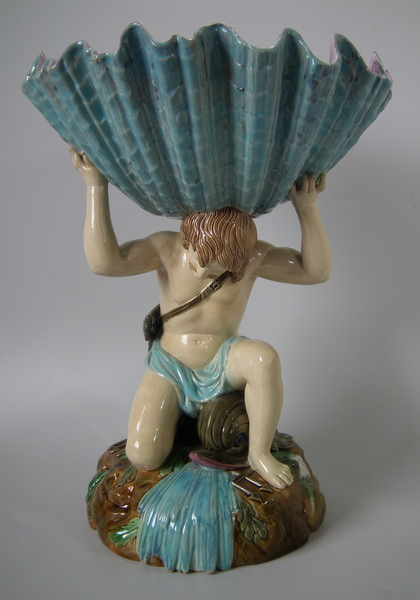
'Neptune', coloured glazes, 1870, Revivalist influence

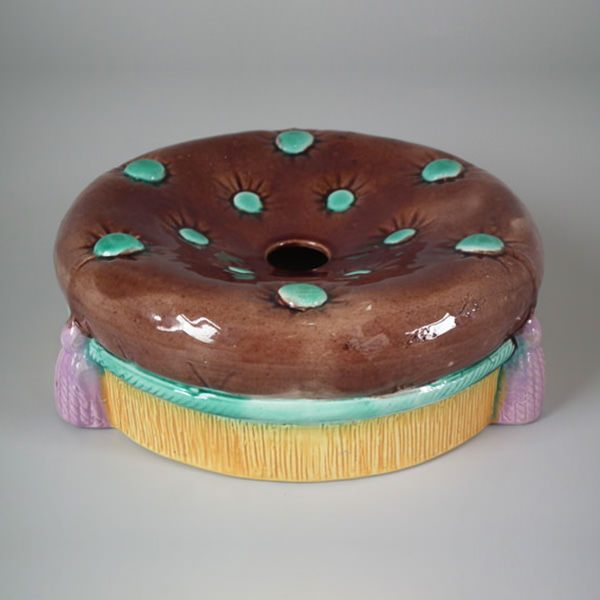
Spitoon, coloured glazes majolica, c. 1880

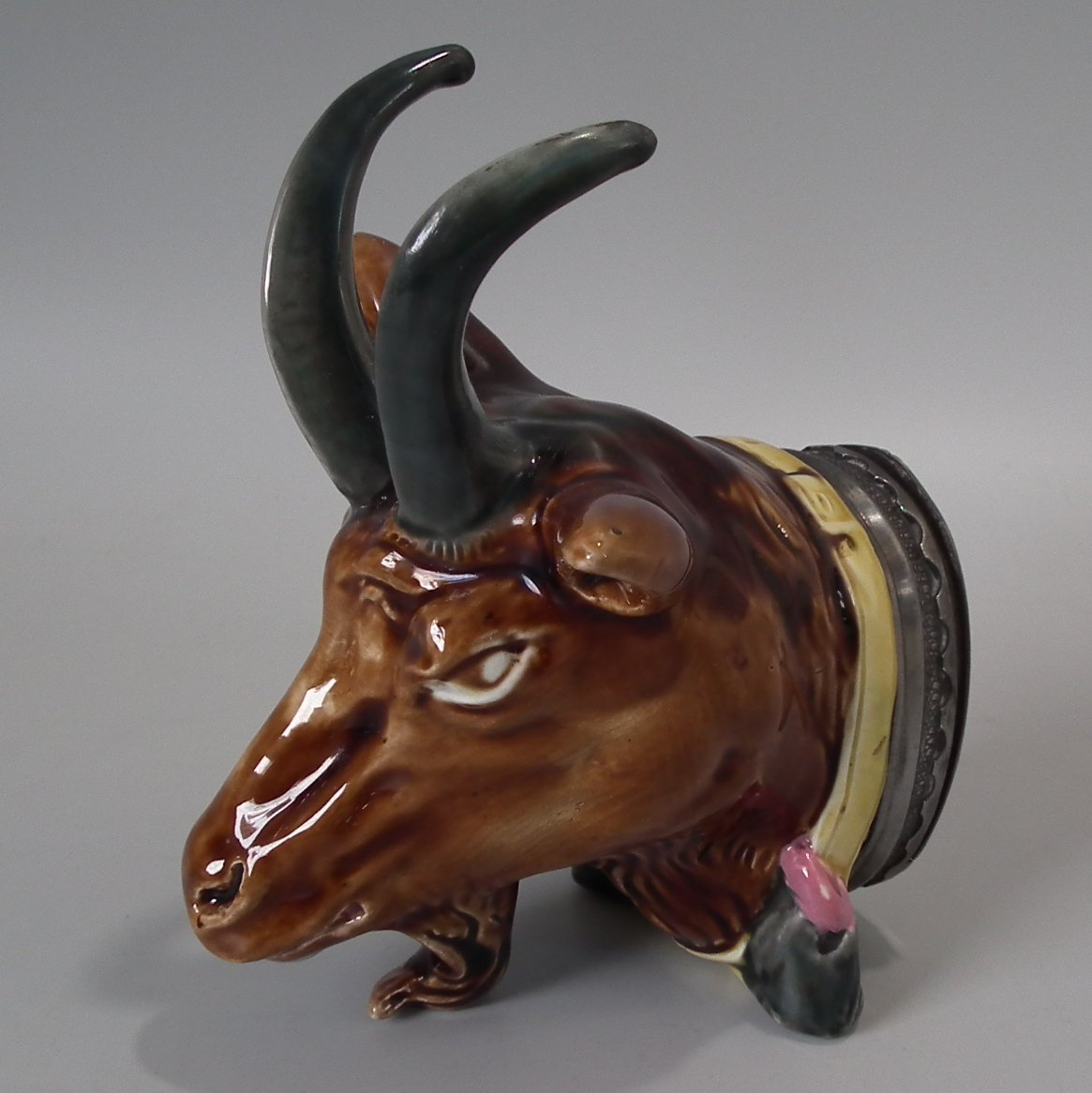
Snuff box, coloured glazes majolica with pewter lid, c. 1870, naturalistic goat figure

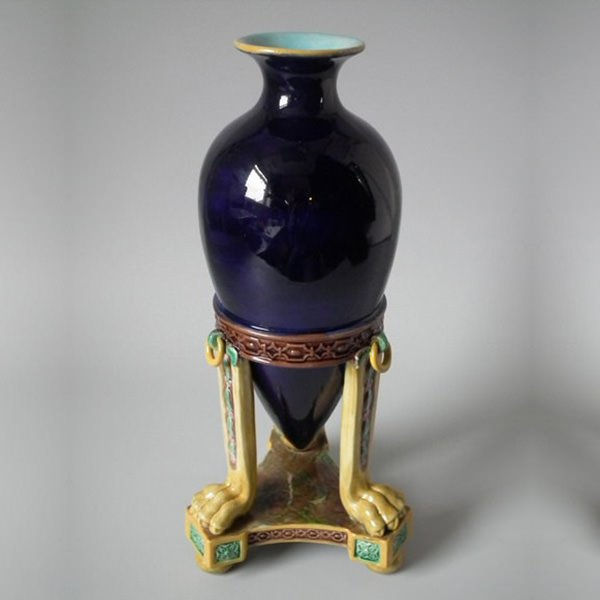
Amphora vase, c. 1870, Egyptian style

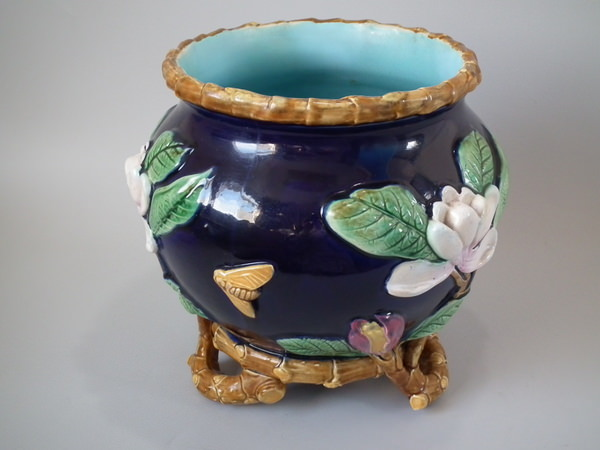
Flower pot, coloured lead glazes on biscuit, raised design of natural flowers

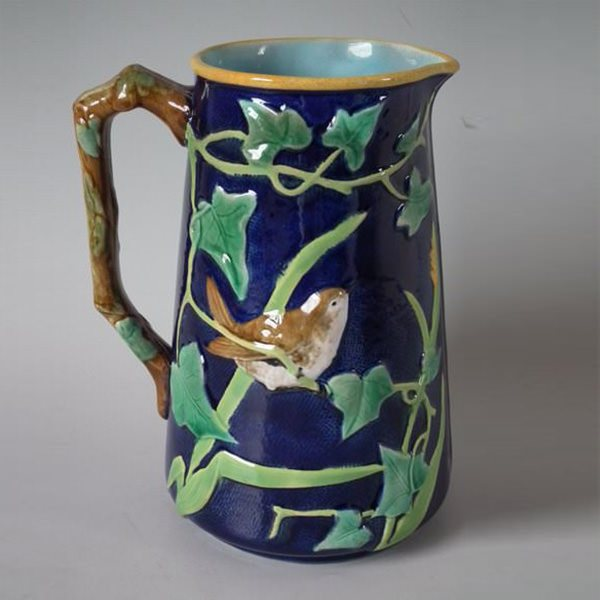
Bird jug, c. 1870, naturalistic style.

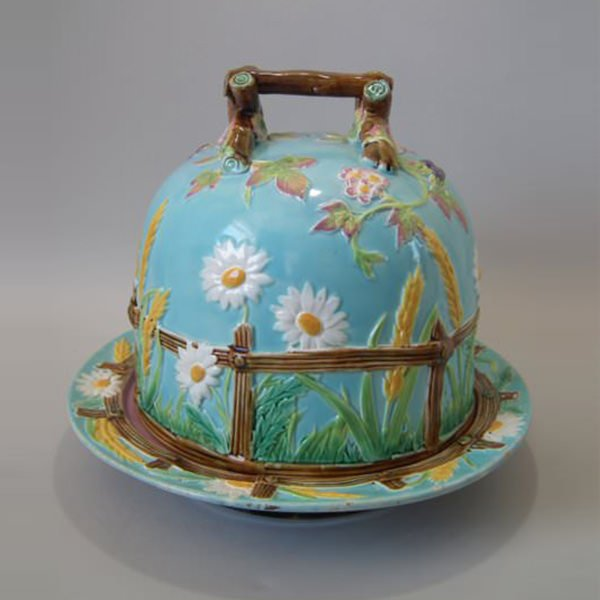
Cheese keep and stand, c. 1870, naturalistic style

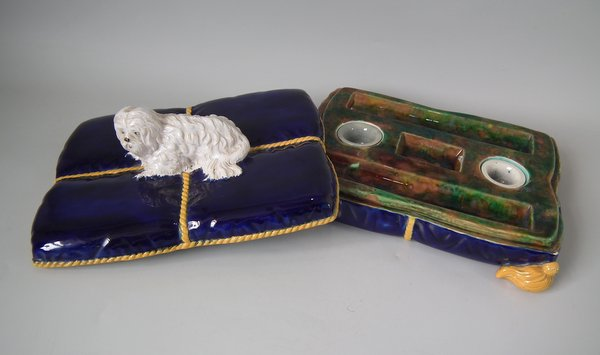
Ladies' desk set for inks, sand and quills, c. 1871, naturalistic style

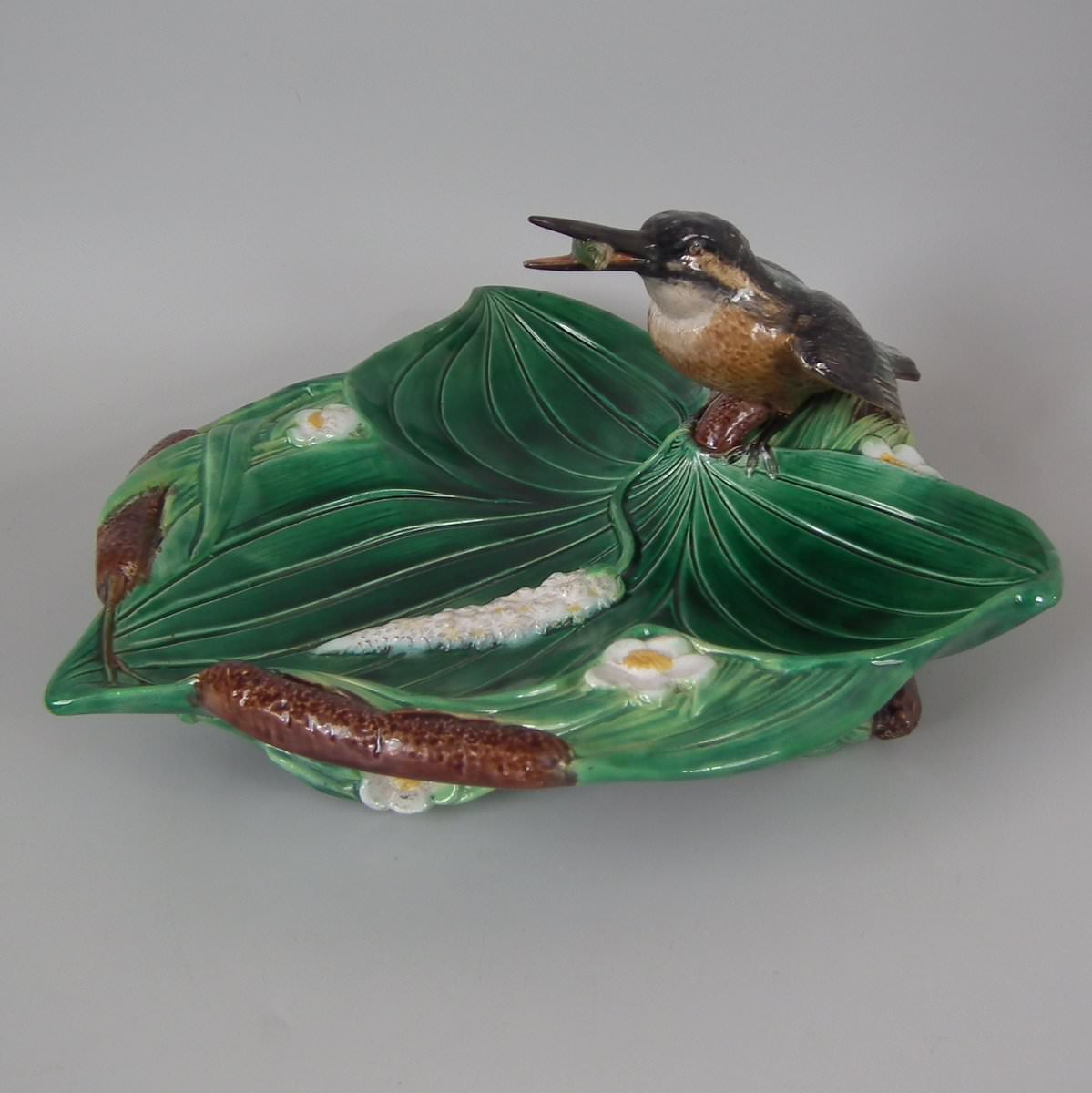
Lily dish with kingfisher, c. 1873, naturalistic style

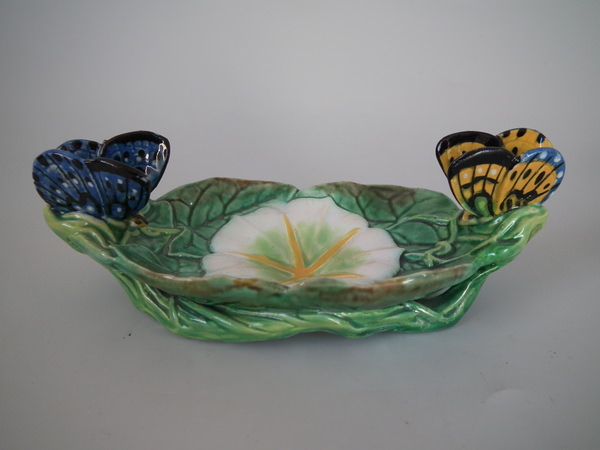
Trinket dish, coloured glazes, c. 1874, spectacularly Naturalistic in style

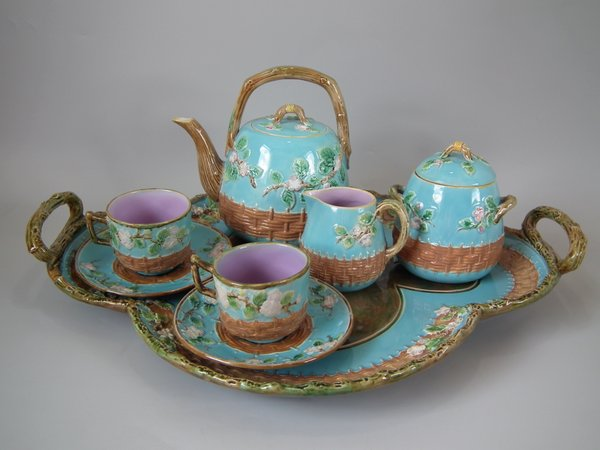
Tea set, c. 1873, naturalistic apple blossom pattern

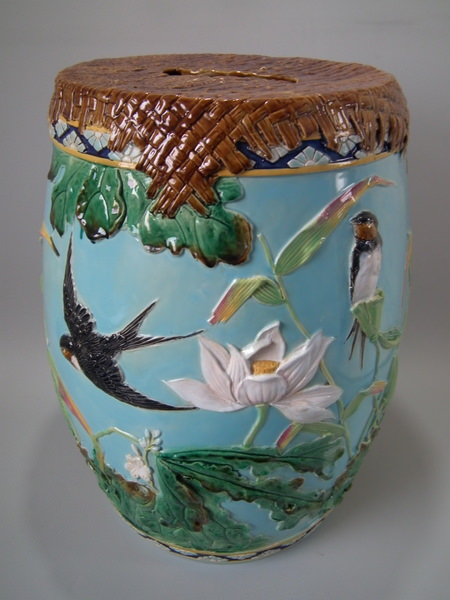
Garden seat, c. 1875, naturalistic style

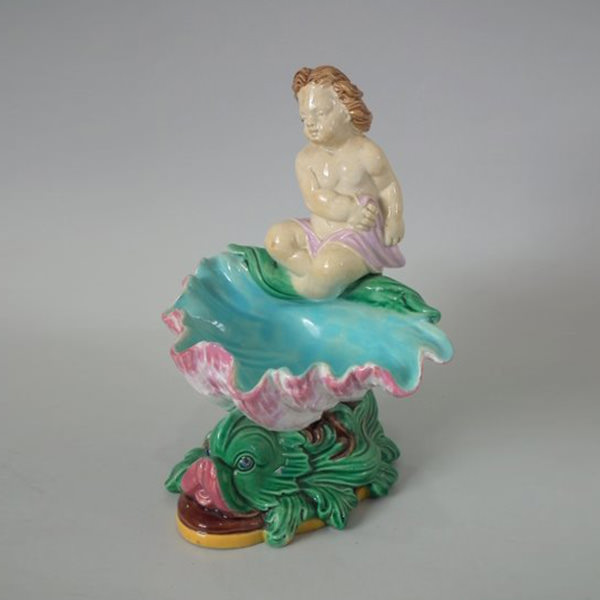
Merman and dolphin dish, c. 1875, Revivalist style

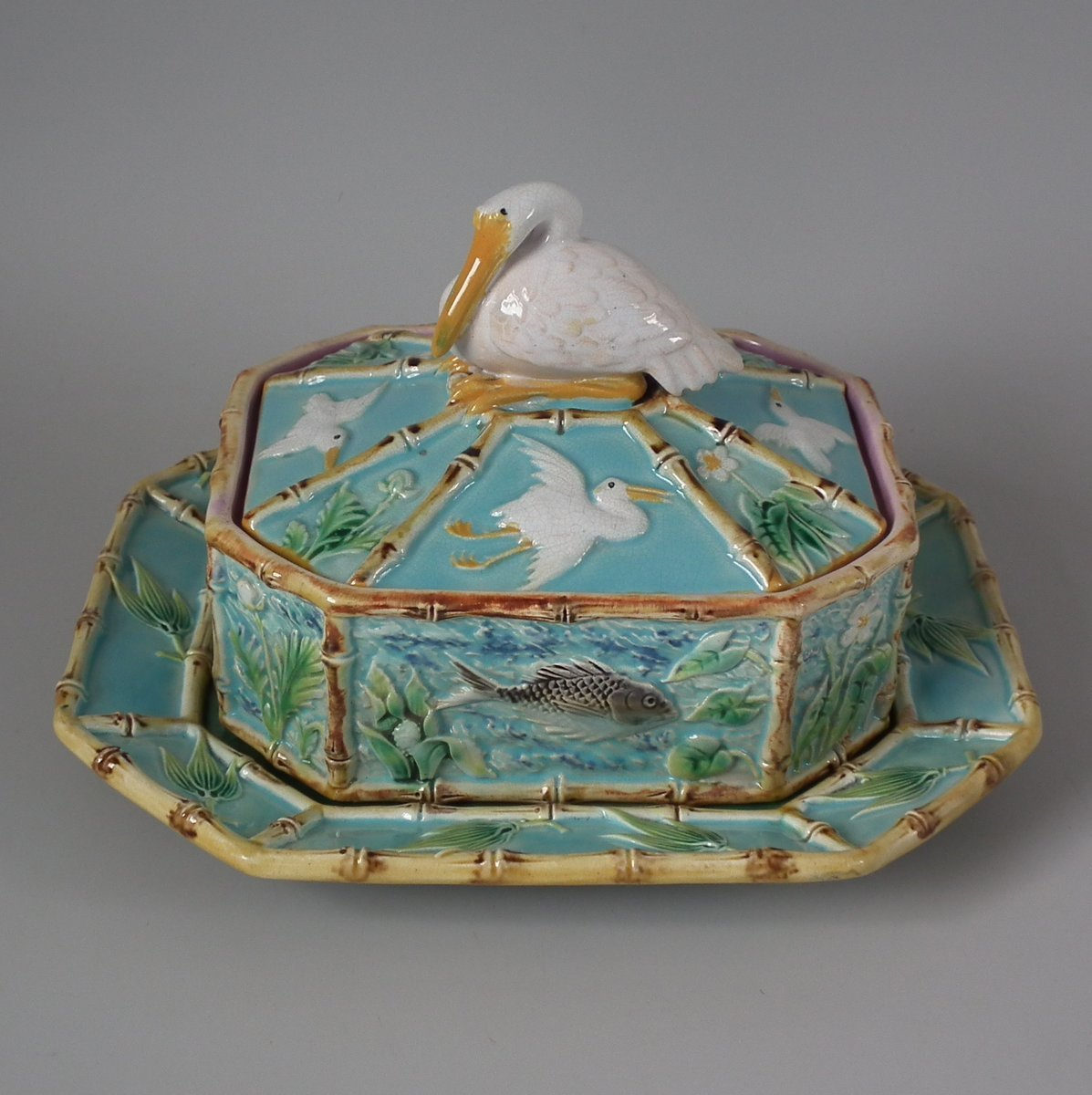
Sardine dish, coloured glazes, c. 1875, spectacularly naturalistic

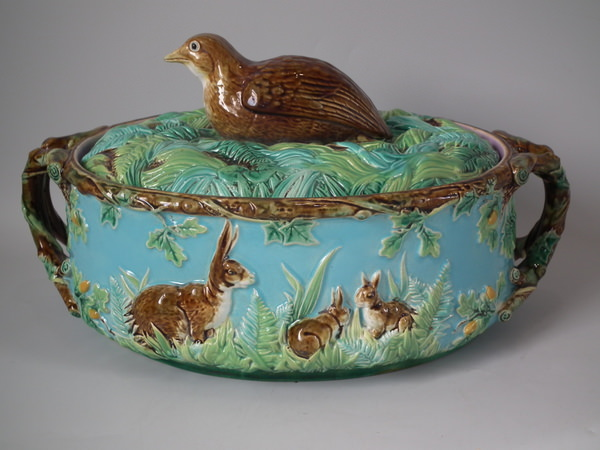
Pie dish, coloured glazes, c. 1877, spectacularly naturalistic in style

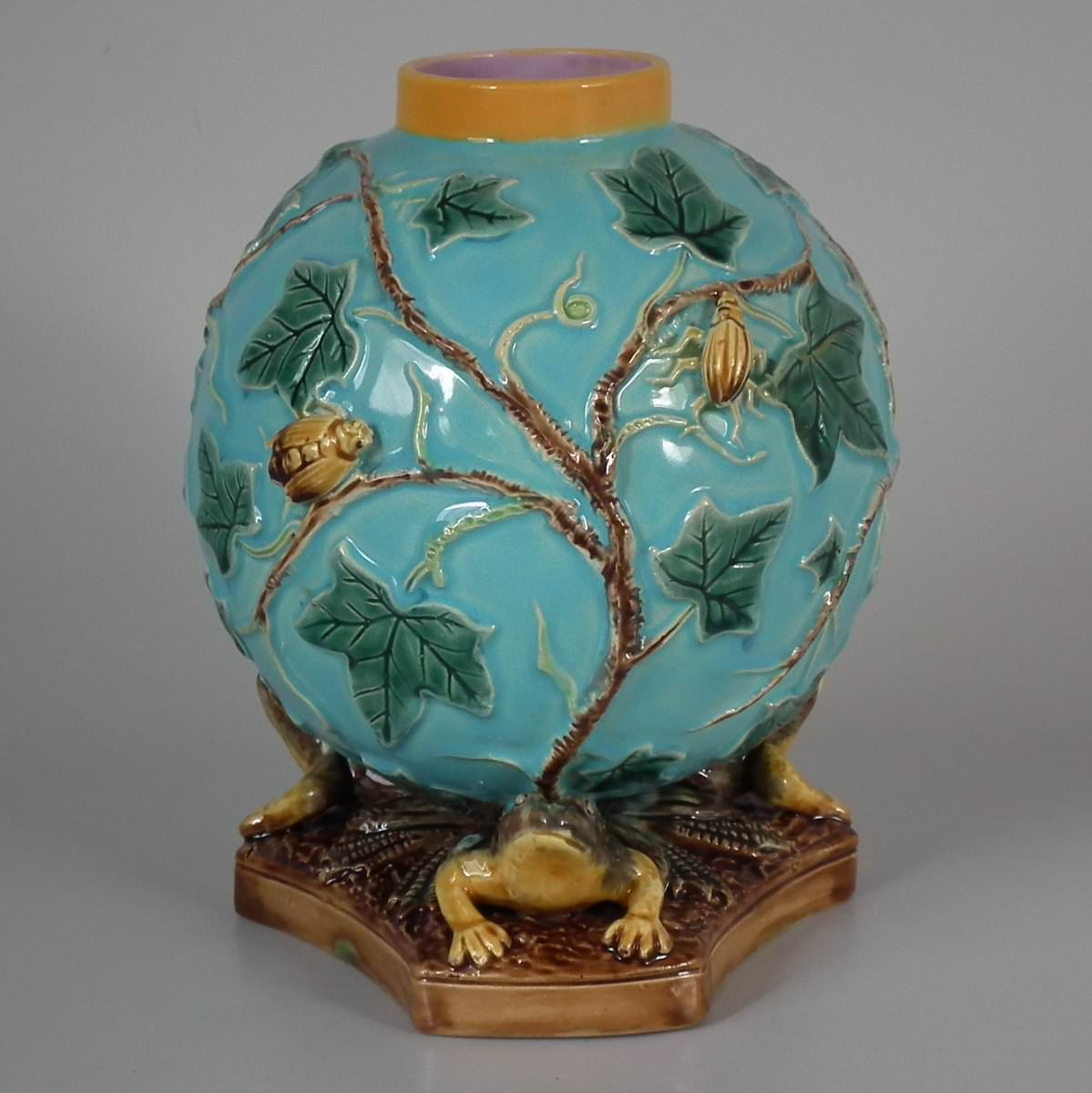
Frog and insect vase, c. 1880, naturalistic in style

=== Joseph Holdcroft ===
- Joseph Holdcroft of Longton.
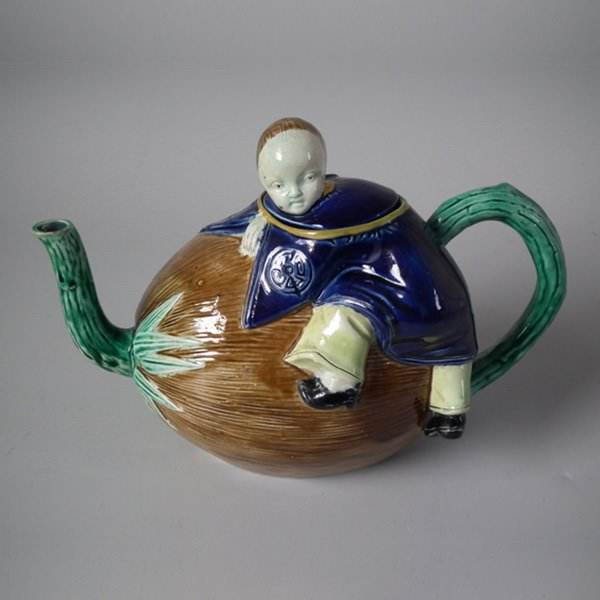
Coloured glazes Oriental Boy on Coconut Teapot and cover, c. 1870

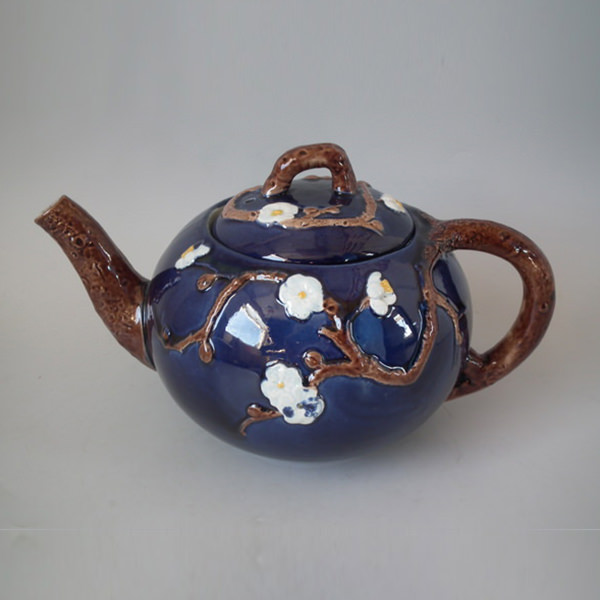
Coloured glazes Floral Teapot and cover, c. 1880

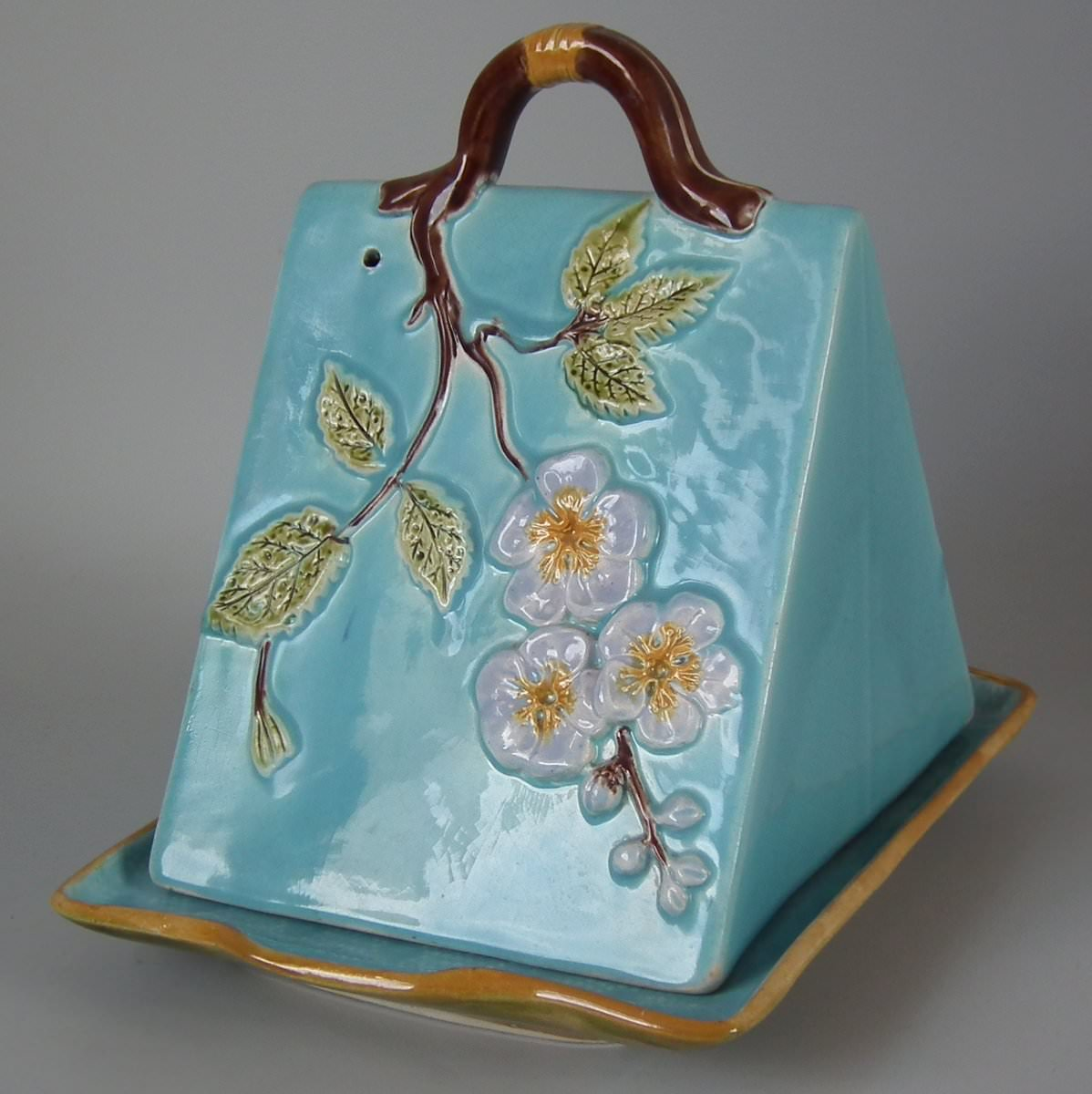
Coloured glazes cheese keep, naturalistic style.

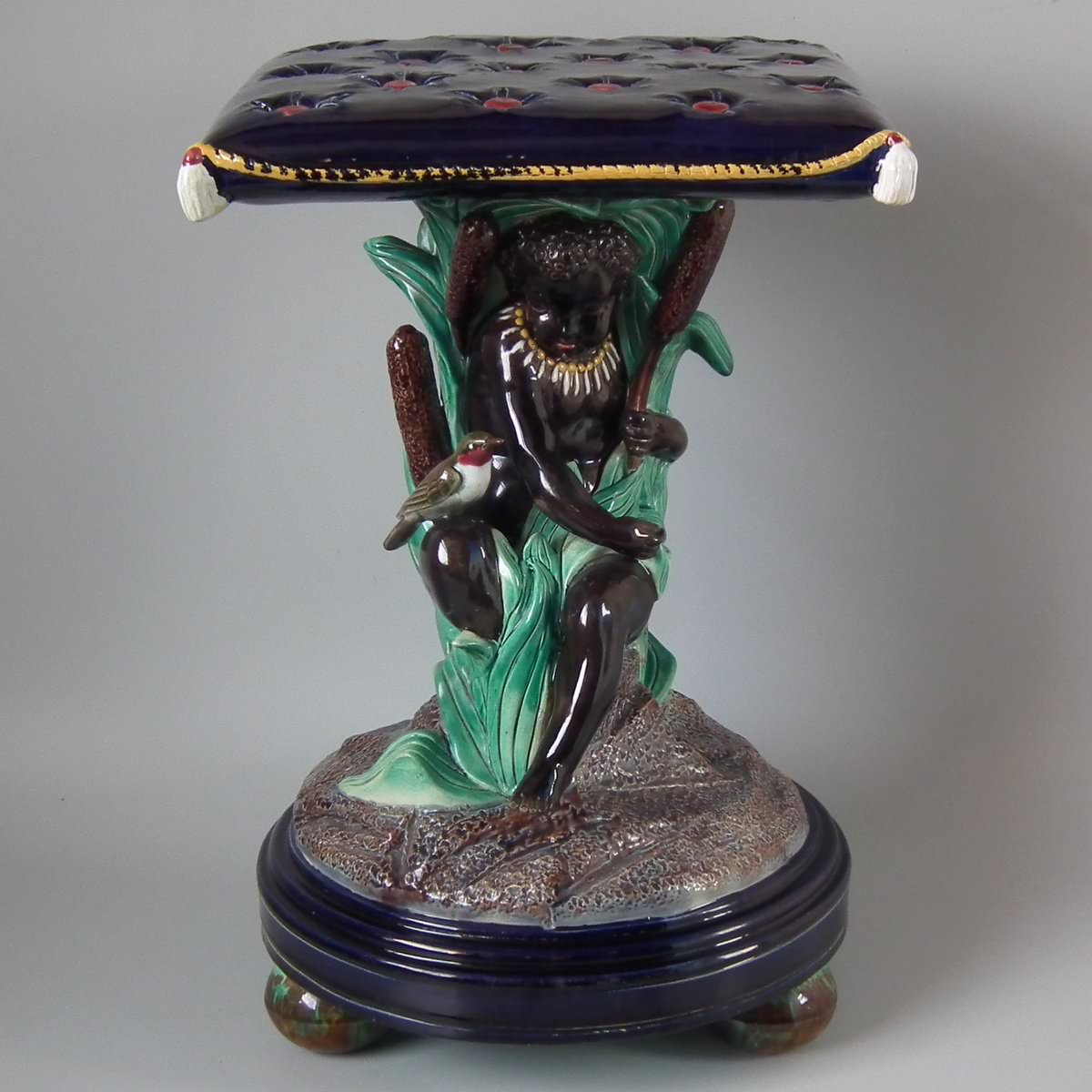
Coloured glazes garden seat, naturalistic style.

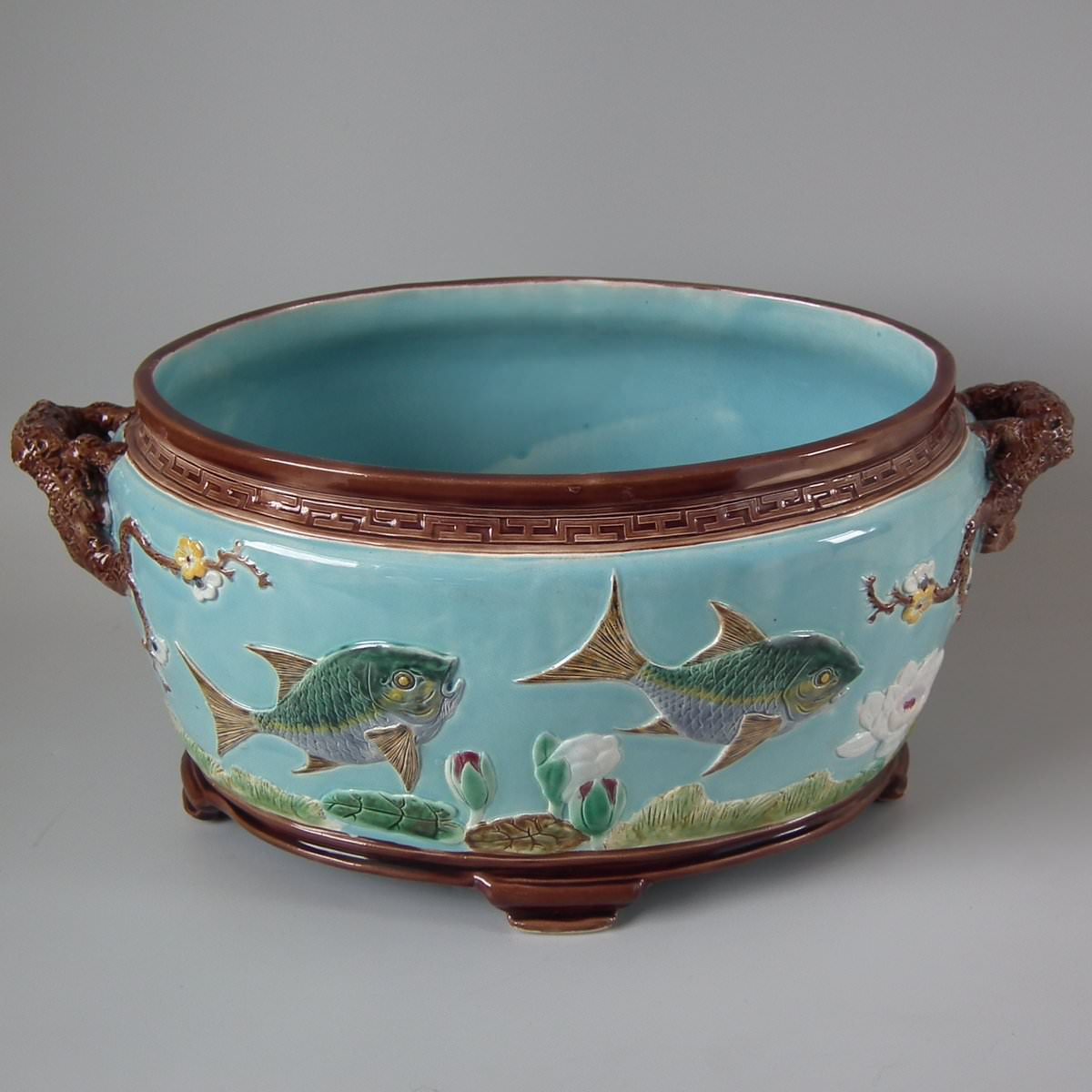
Coloured glazes fish and lilies jardiniere, naturalistic style

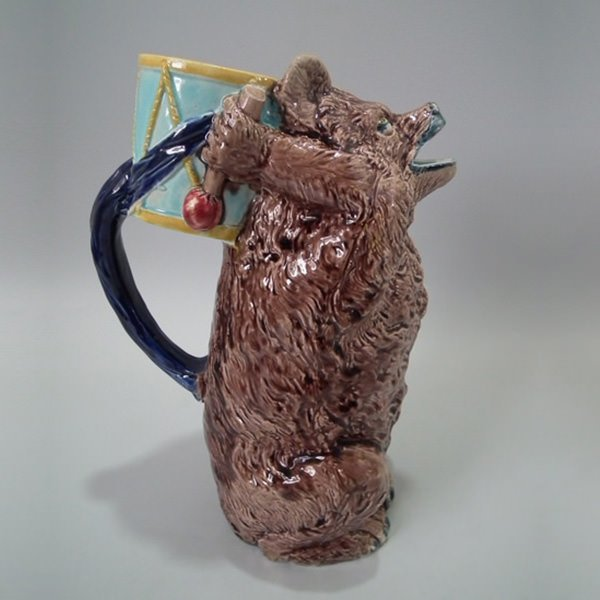
Holdcroft jug, 9.6 in, c. 1870, naturalistic coloured glazes majolica

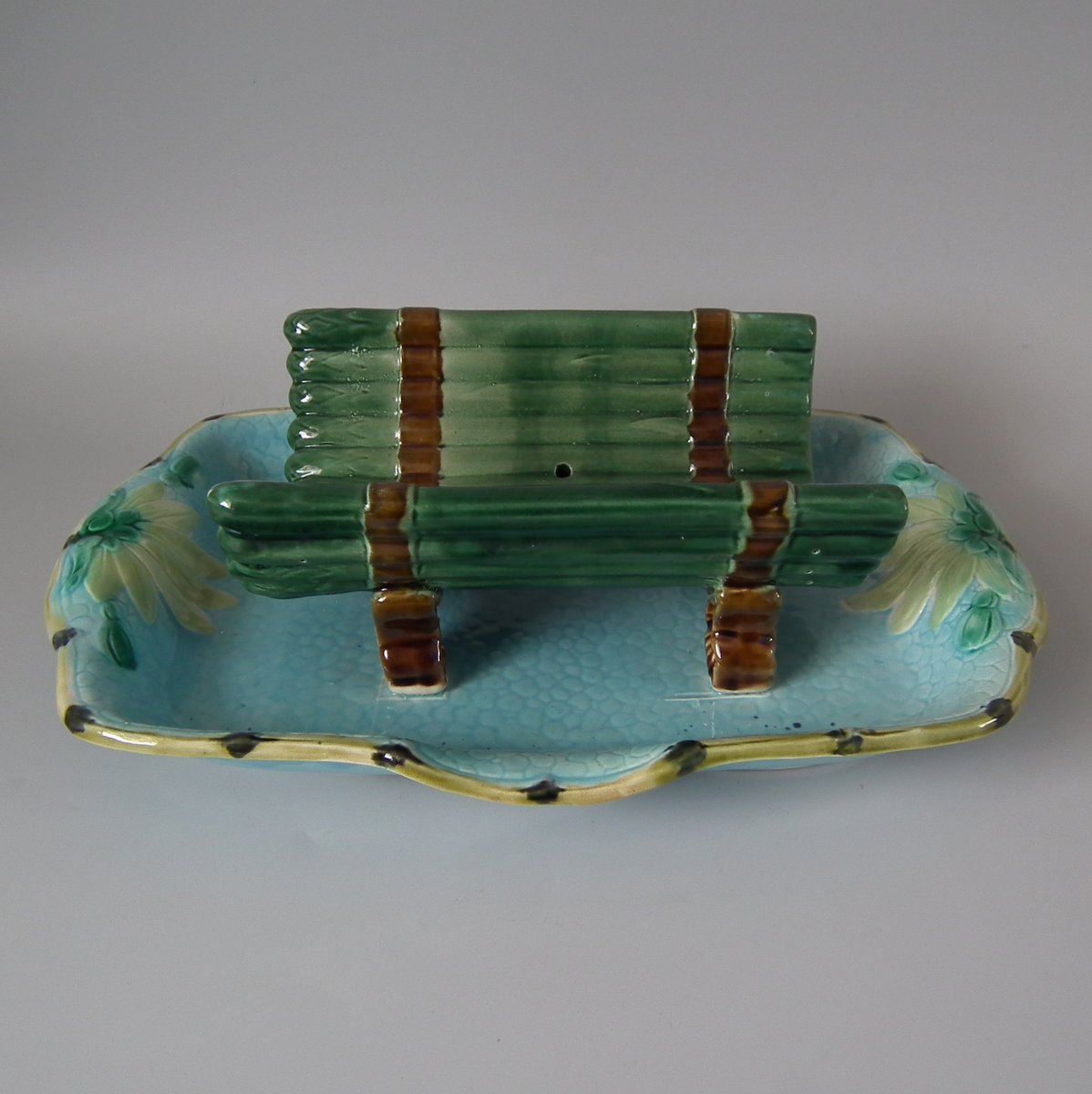
Holdcroft Asparagus server table ware, 13.4 in, c. 1870, naturalistic coloured glazes majolica

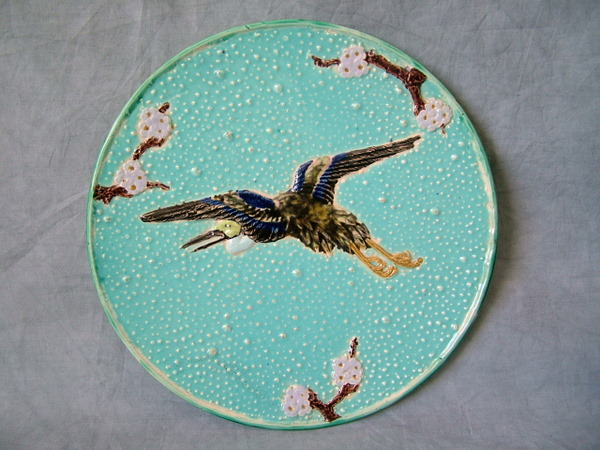
Holdcroft Dessert plate, coloured glazes, c 1870, naturalistic style

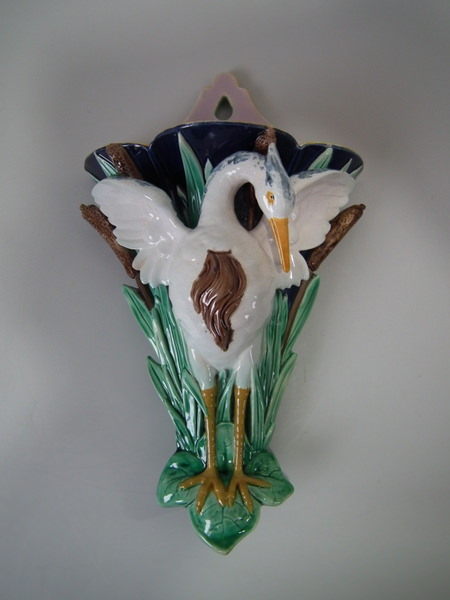
Wall Pocket coloured glazes, c. 1870, naturalistic in style

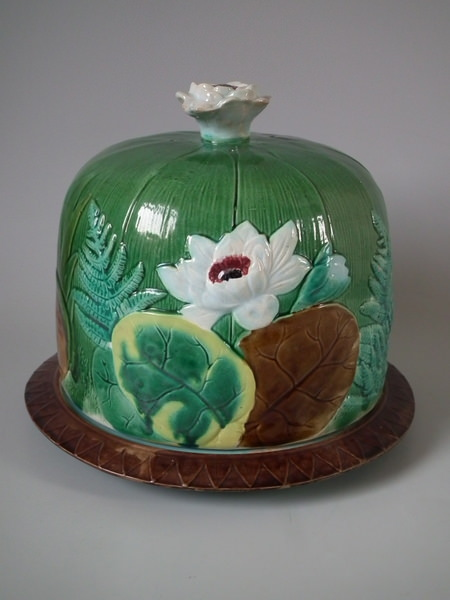
Cheese Dome and Stand, coloured glazes, naturalistic in style, c. 1880

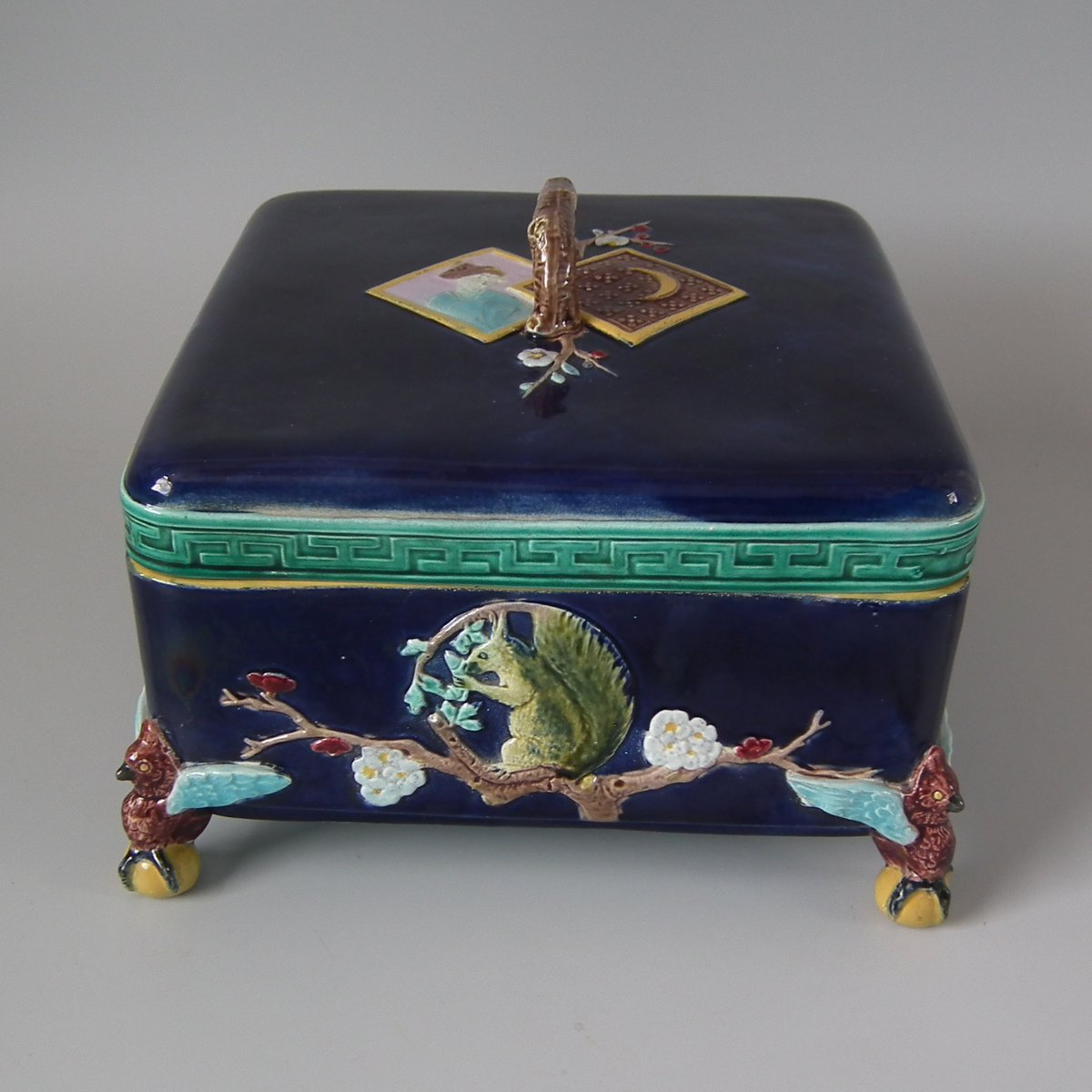
Coloured glazes box and cover, Aesthetic style, c. 1880

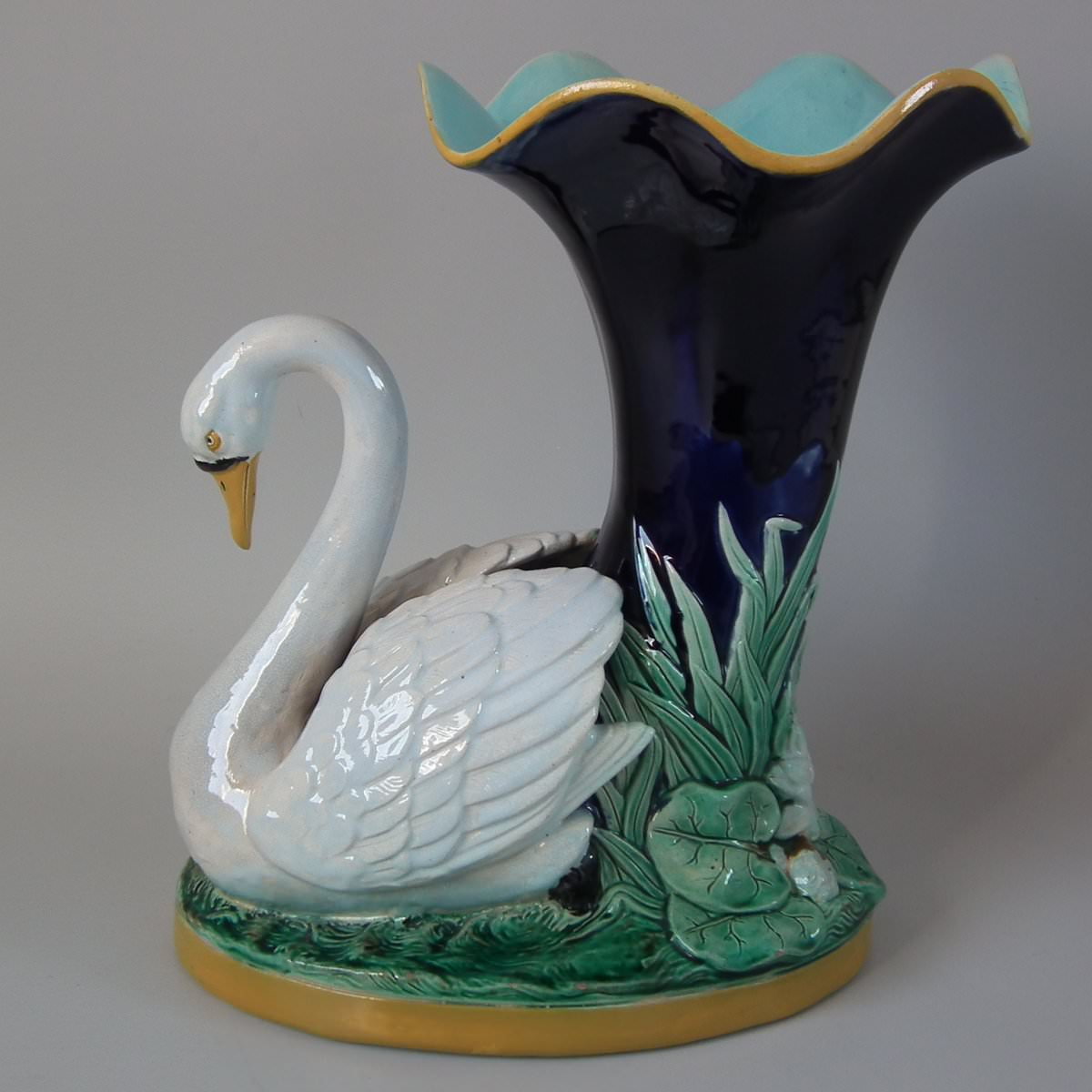
Coloured glazes swan vase, c. 1875, naturalistic in style

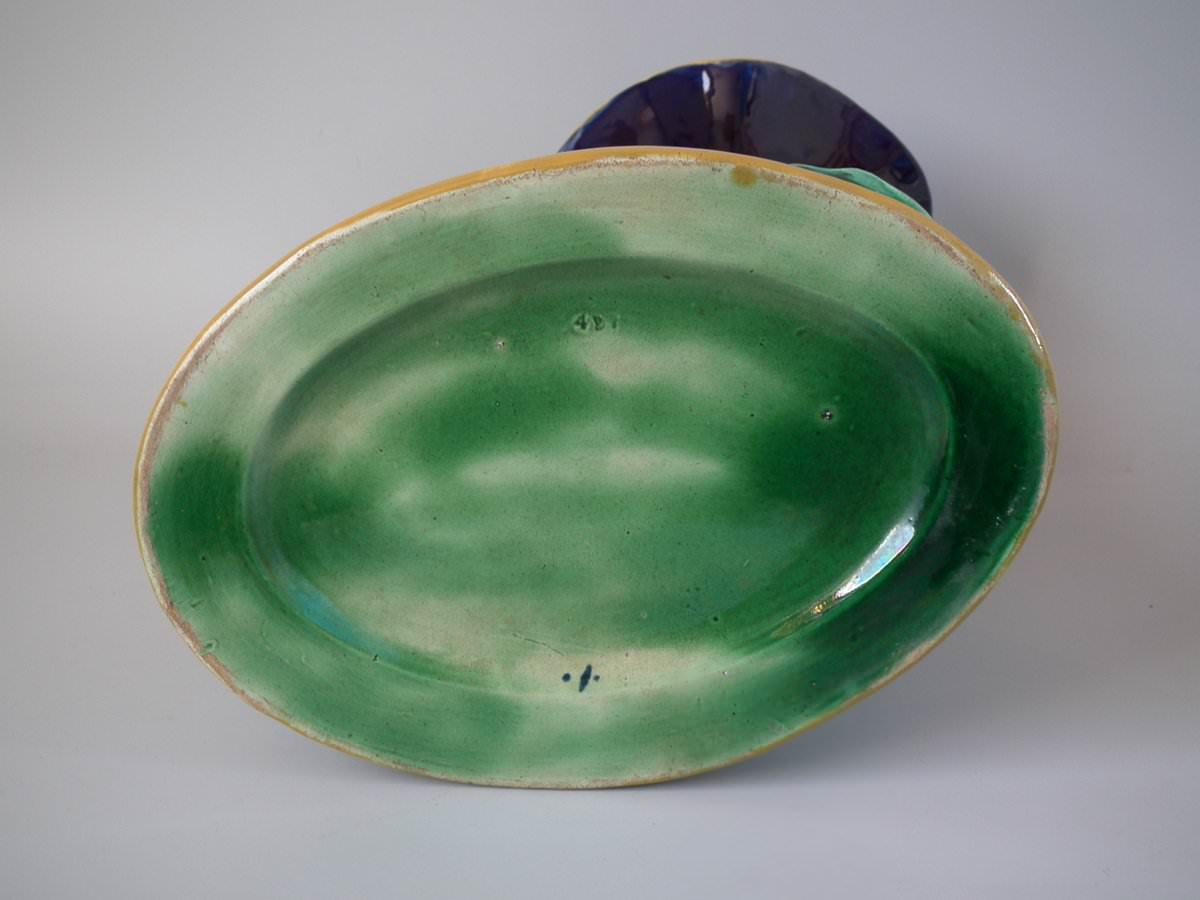
Coloured glazes swan base, impressed pattern number

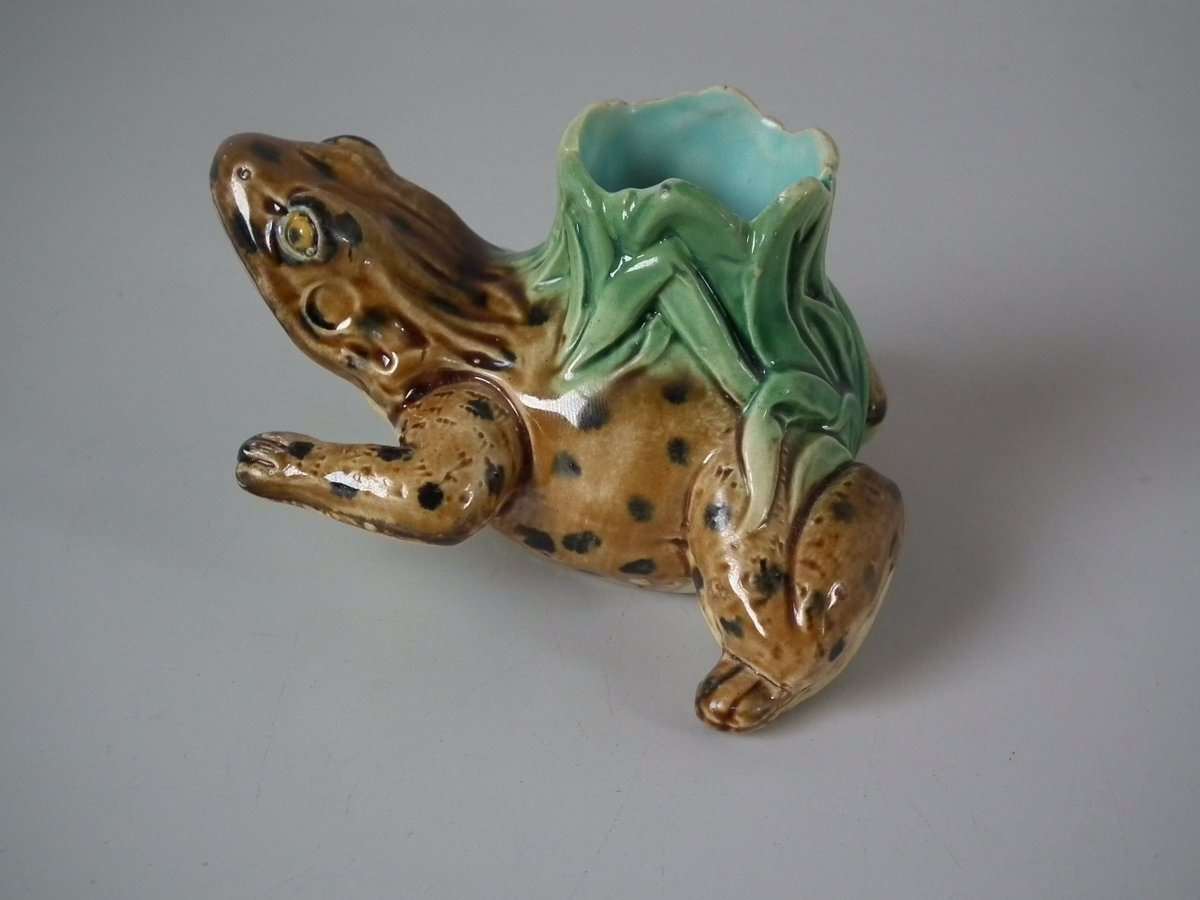
Coloured glazes frog toothpick holder, c. 1870

=== Brownfield ===
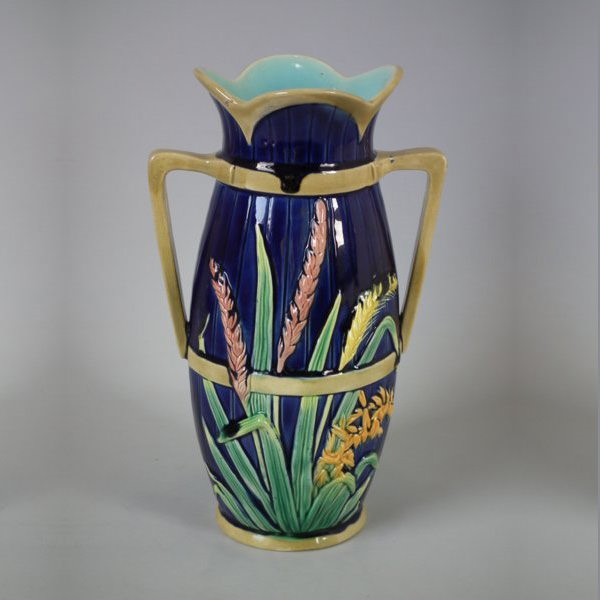
Coloured glazes vase, c. 1875

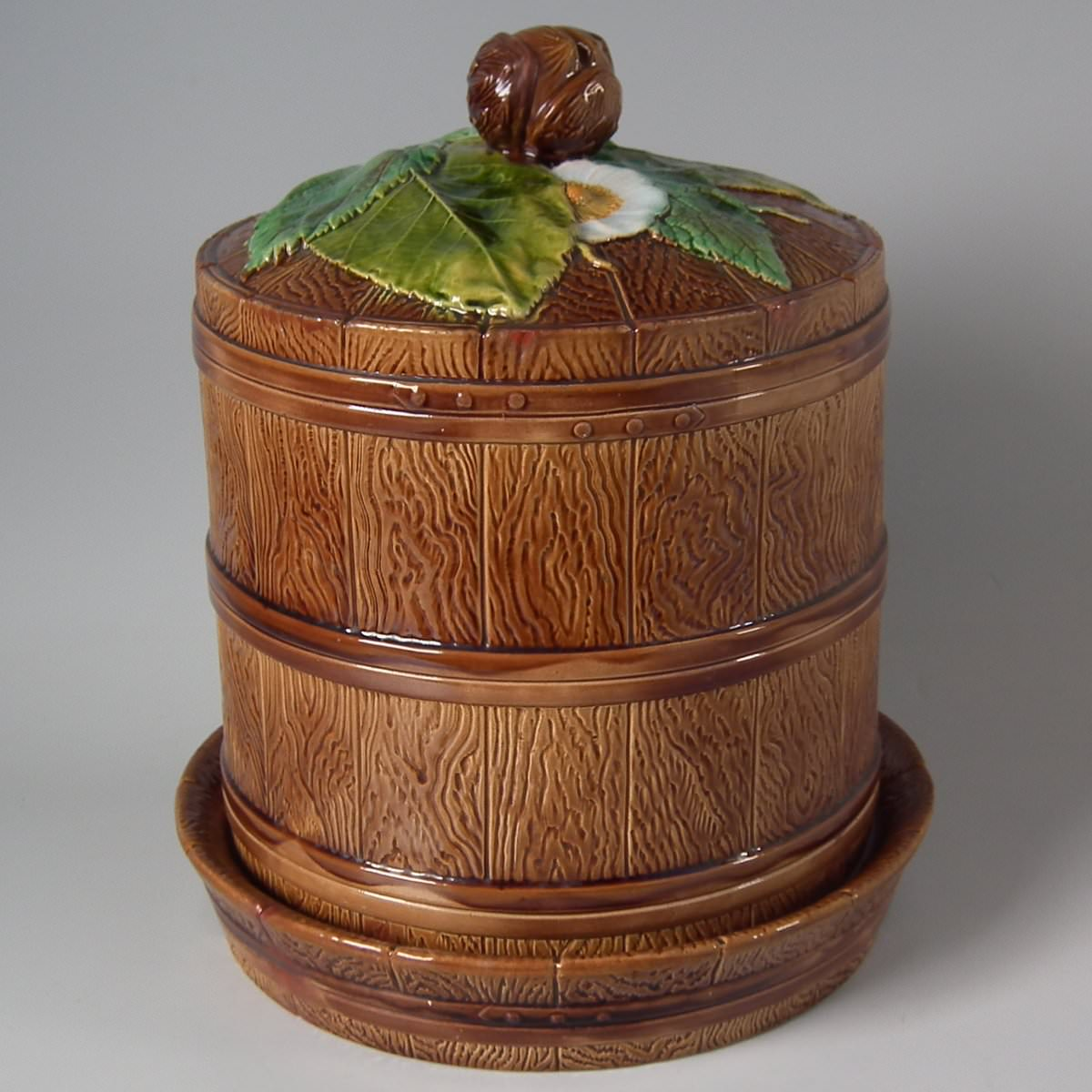
Chestnut finial coloured glazes dish and cover, c. 1880

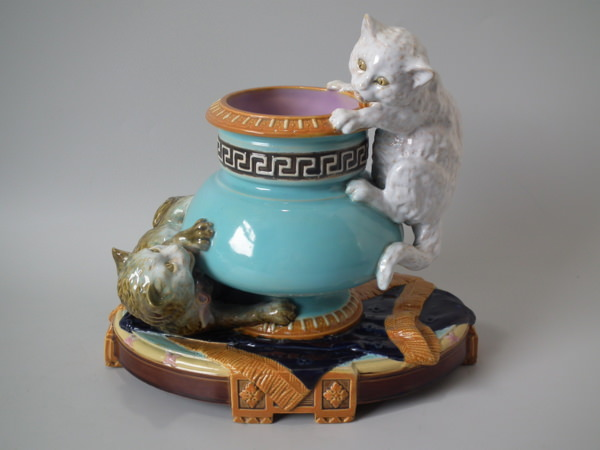
Cats Vase, coloured glazes, c. 1875

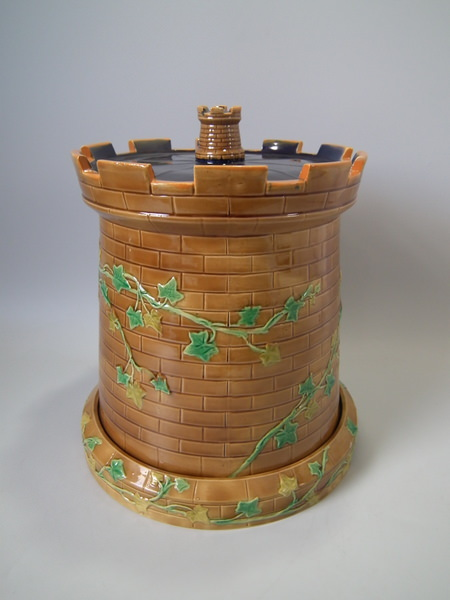
Cheese keep and underplate, coloured glazes, c. 1870

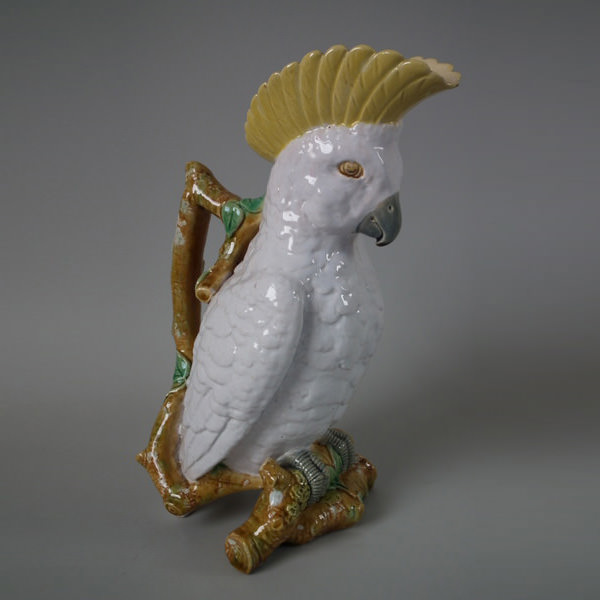
Coloured glazes majolica Cockatoo, c. 1870

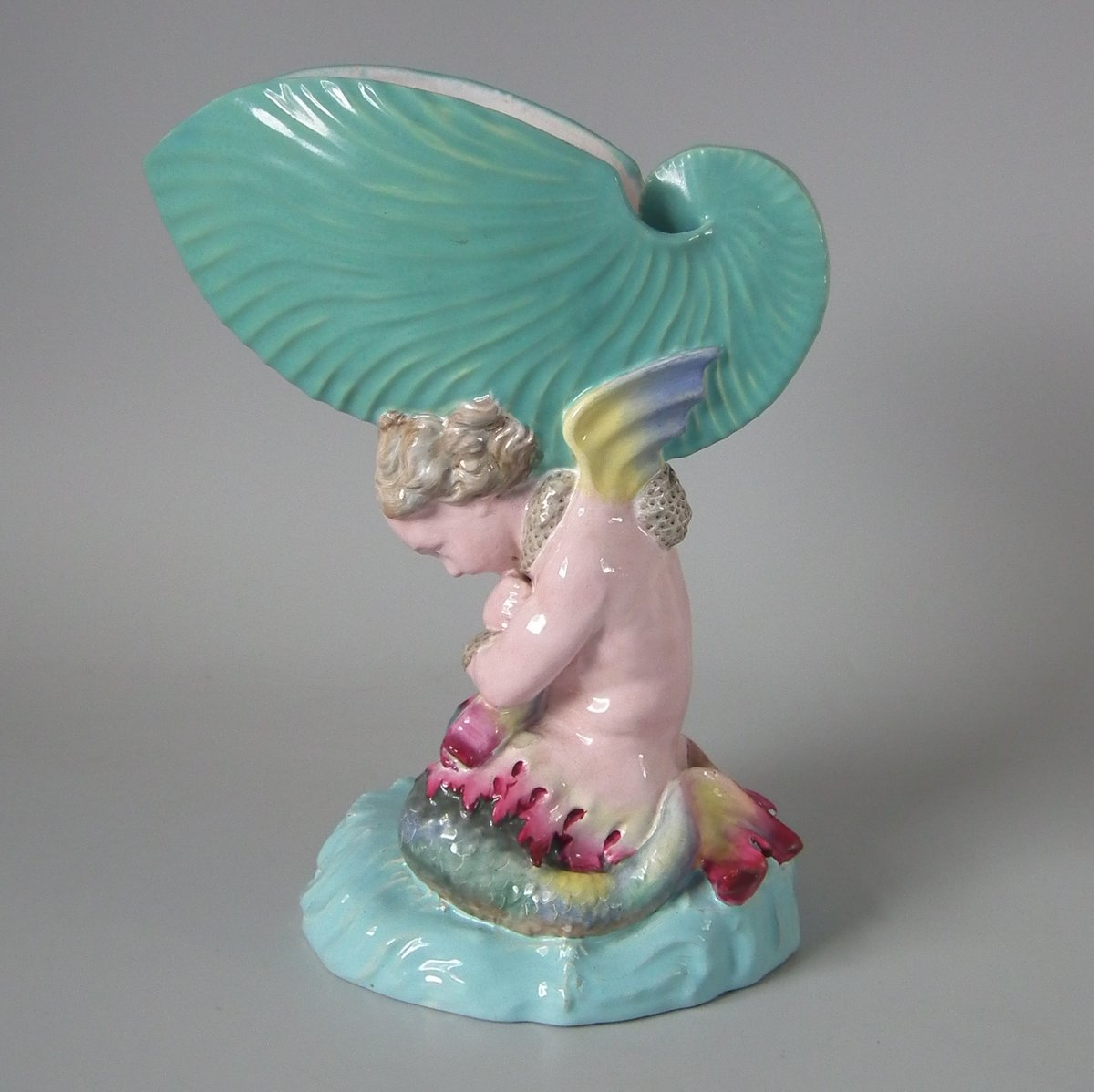
Brownfield coloured glazes majolica Sauceboat, c. 1870, Revivalist references

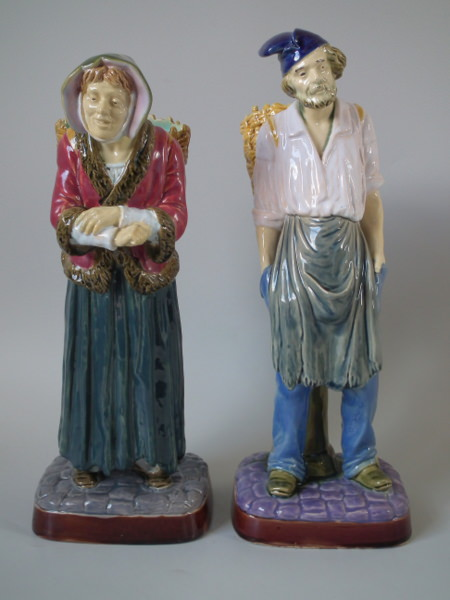
Brownfield Peasant Figures, 13.2 in, coloured glazes majolica, c. 1880

=== Brown Westhead Moore ===
- Brown-Westhead, Moore & Co
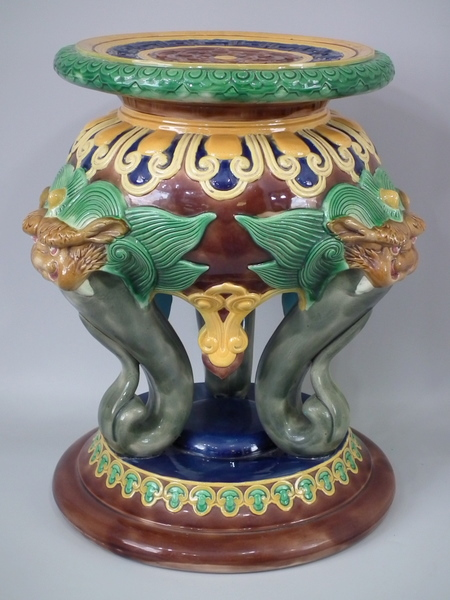
Garden Seat, coloured lead glazes

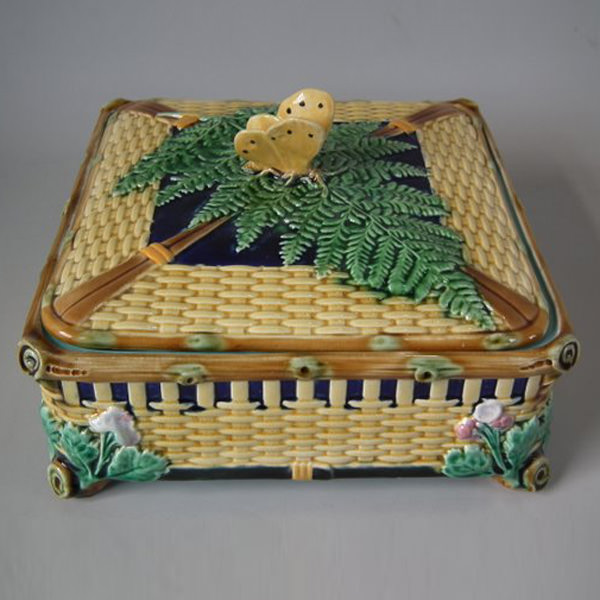
Butterfly box and cover, coloured glazes, c. 1860

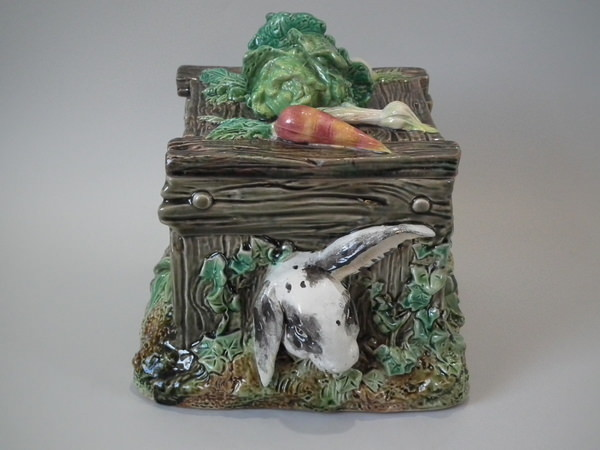
Rabbit box and cover, coloured glazes, c. 1870

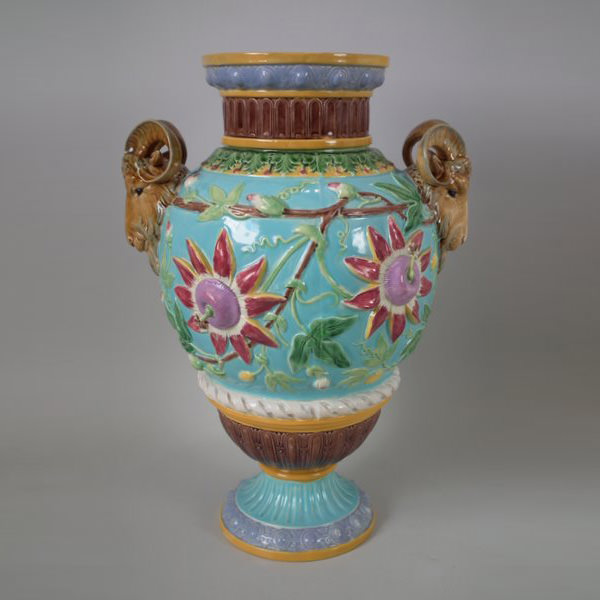
Vase, coloured glazes, c. 1875

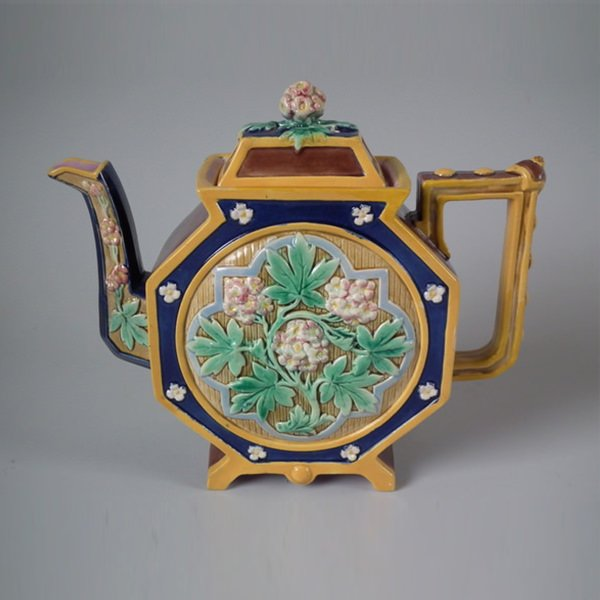
Brown Westhead Moore coloured glazes hexagonal teapot and cover, c. 1870

=== Copeland ===
- Copeland & Garrett, successors to Josiah Spode
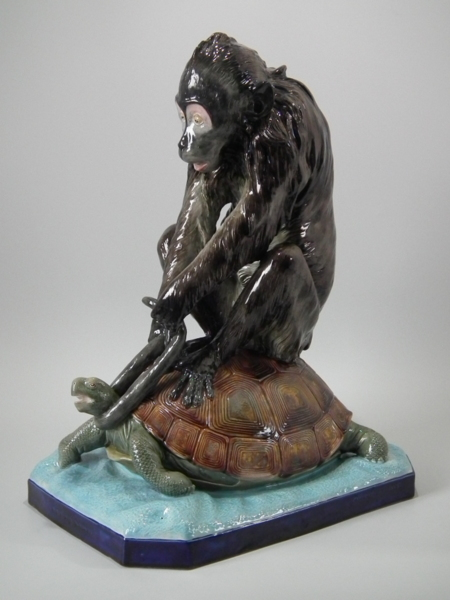
Copeland coloured glazes majolica, 'Sloth and Mischief'

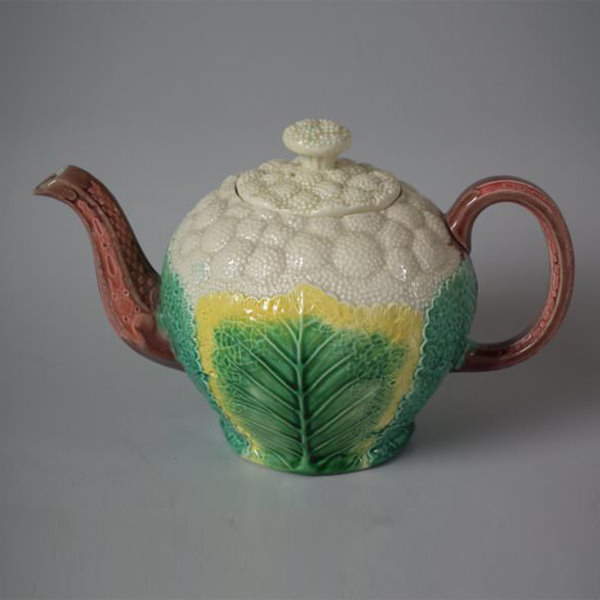
Cauliflower teapot, coloured glazes, naturalistic in style, c. 1870

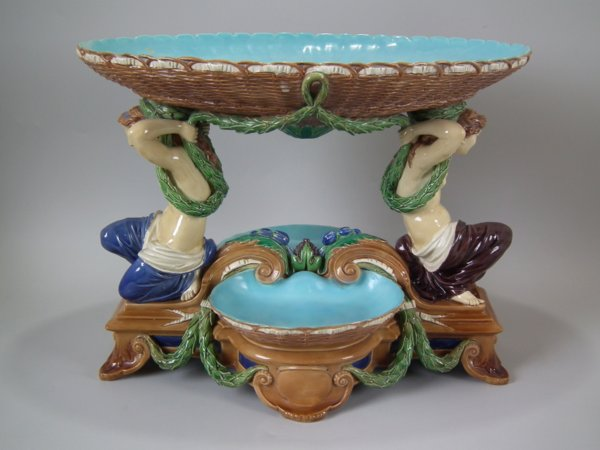
Centrepiece, 16.5 in, coloured glazes, Revivalist in style, c. 1870

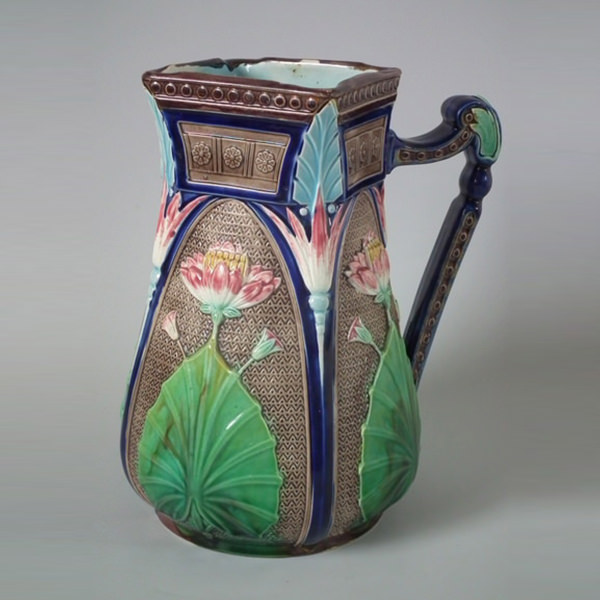
Jug-Pitcher, 7.8 in, coloured glazes, Revivalist in style, c. 1877

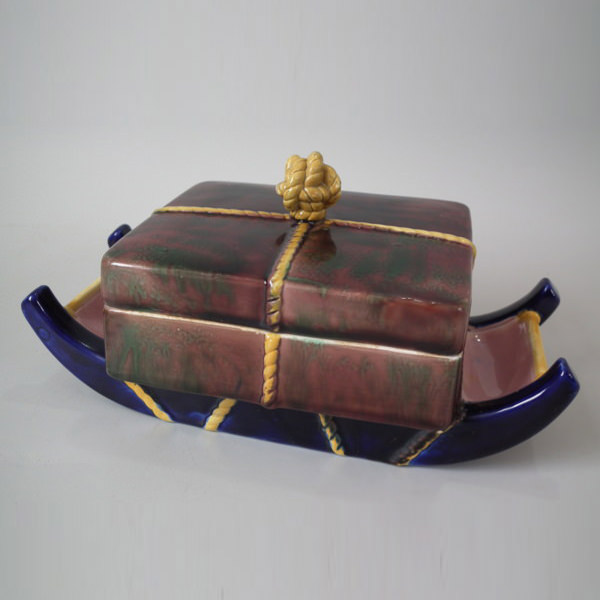
Sardine box, 9.3 in, coloured and mottled glazes, quirky 'High Victorian' in style, c. 1870

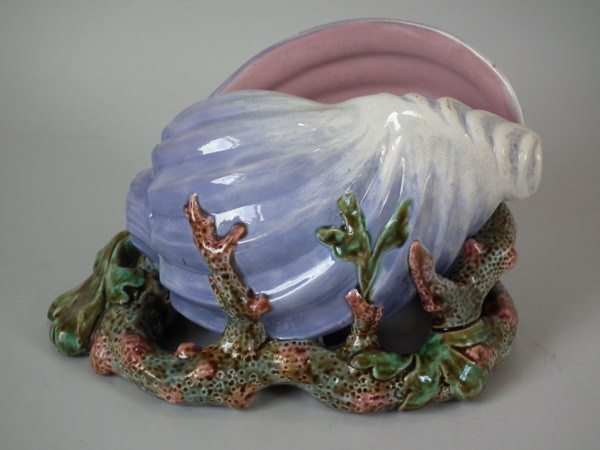
Spoon warmer, 9.3 in, coloured and mottled glazes, quirky naturalistic in style, c. 1870

=== Thomas Forester ===
- Thomas Forester & Sons
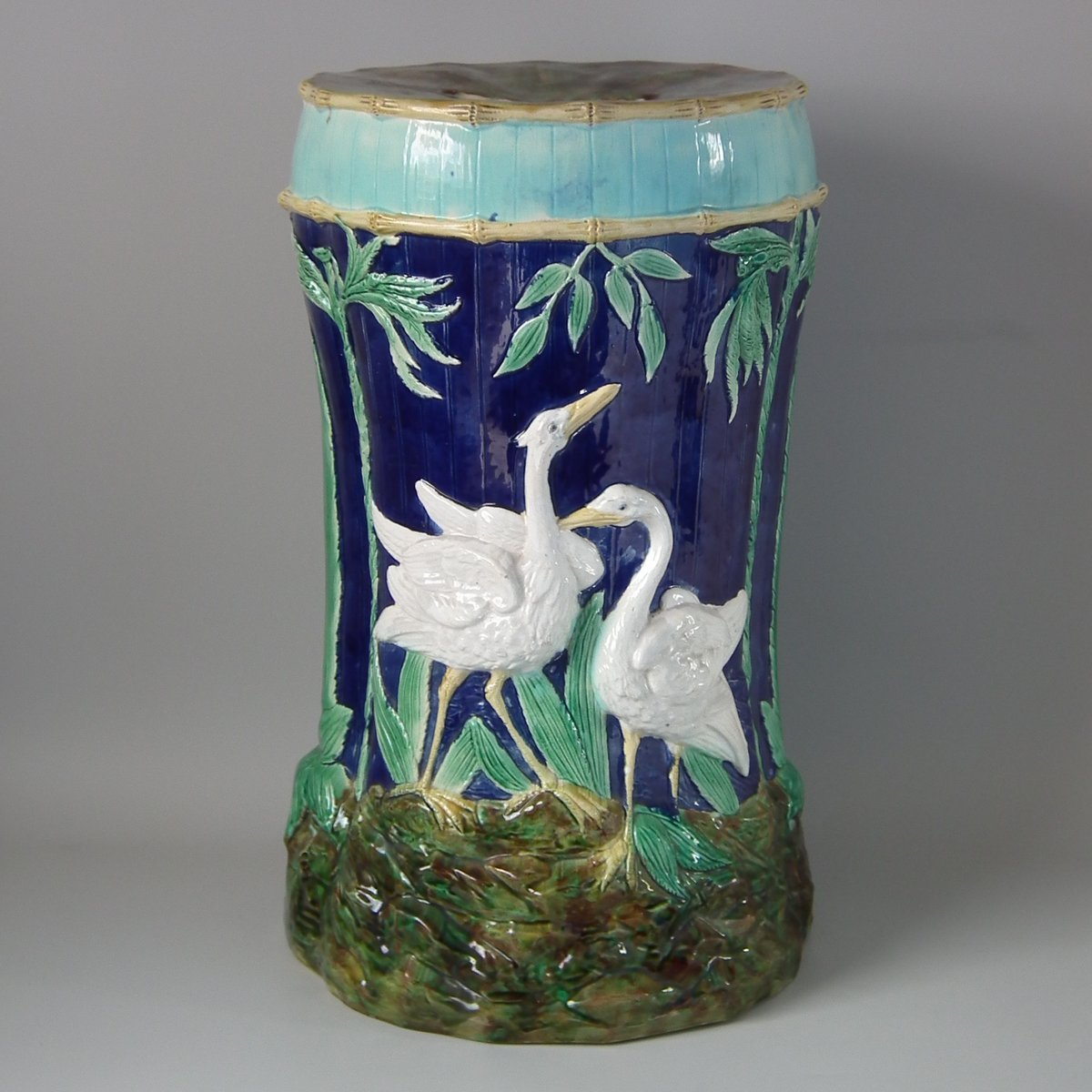
Garden seat, 20.9 in, coloured glazes, c. 1880, storks and bamboo pattern

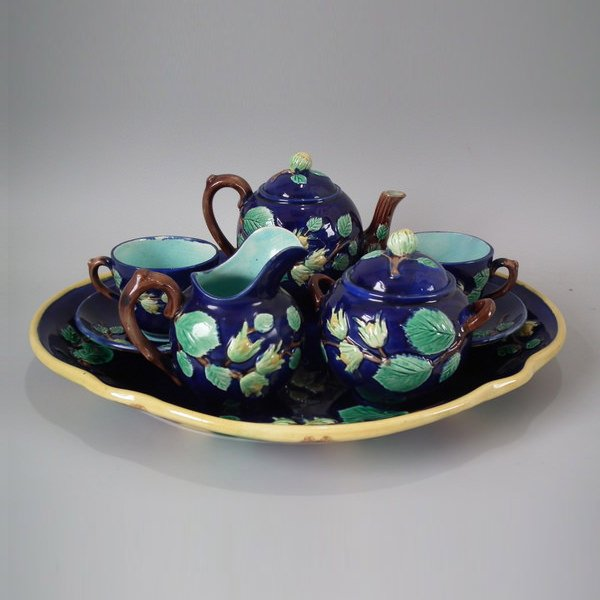
Tea set, coloured glazes, c. 1880, hazelnut pattern

=== Samuel Lear ===
- Samuel Lear
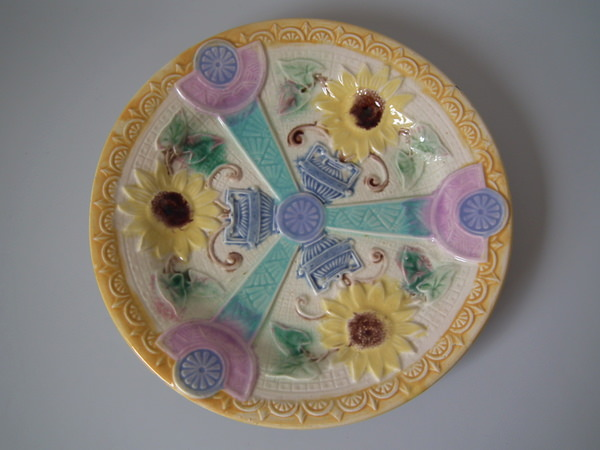
Lear Dessert plate, coloured glazes majolica, c. 1880, sunflowers pattern

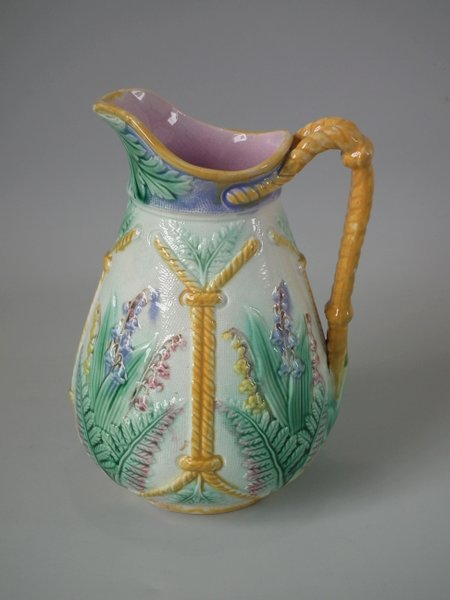
Lear Jug, coloured glazes majolica, c. 1880, lily of the valley pattern

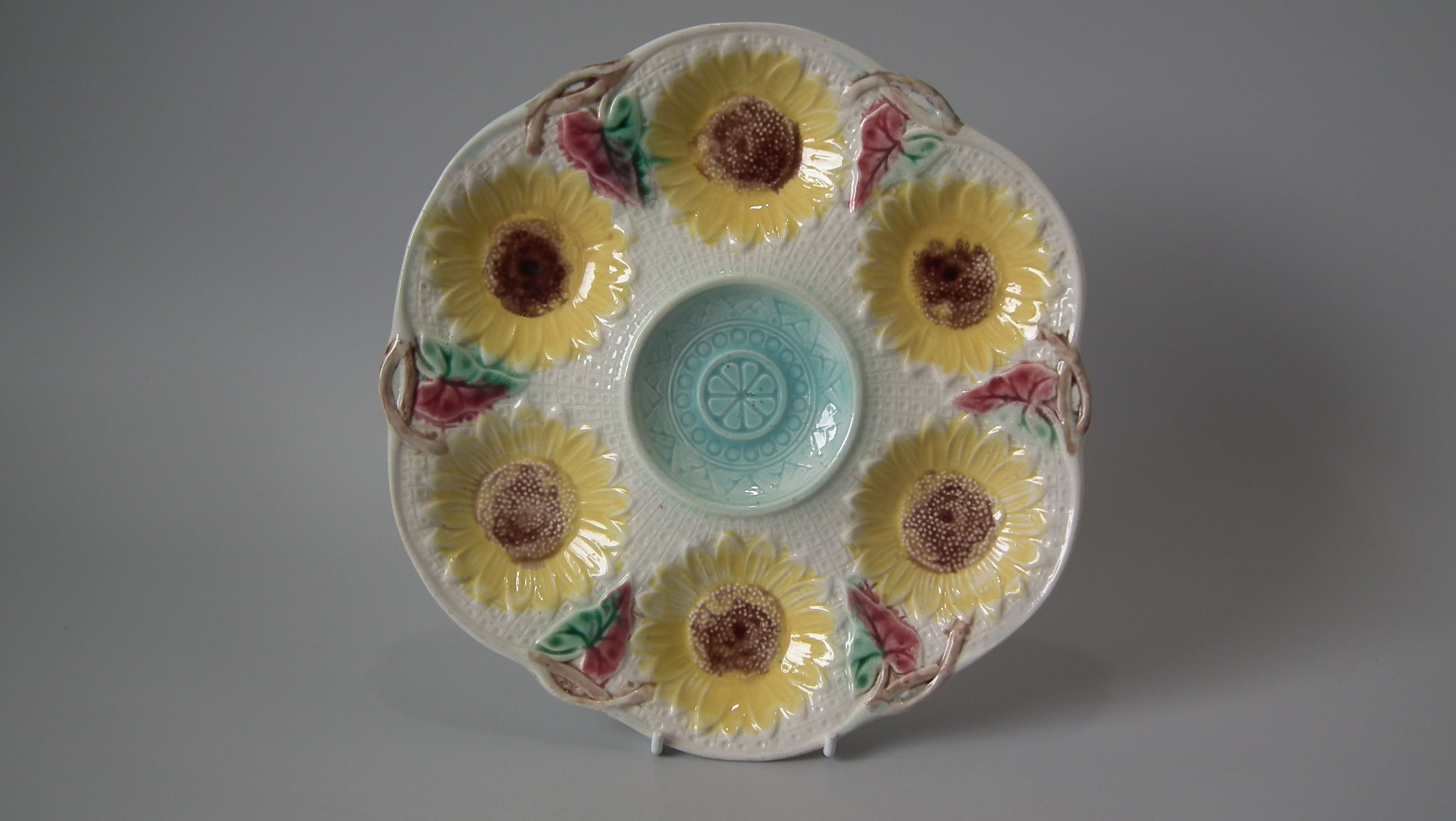
Oyster plate, 9.6 in, coloured glazes, c. 1881, sunflower pattern
- Poole and Unwin

=== Fielding ===
- S. Fielding and Co., The Railway Pottery, Stoke on Trent
- Daniel Sutherland and Sons
- James Woodward

=== Adams and Bromley ===
- J.W. John Adams and Co., Hanley
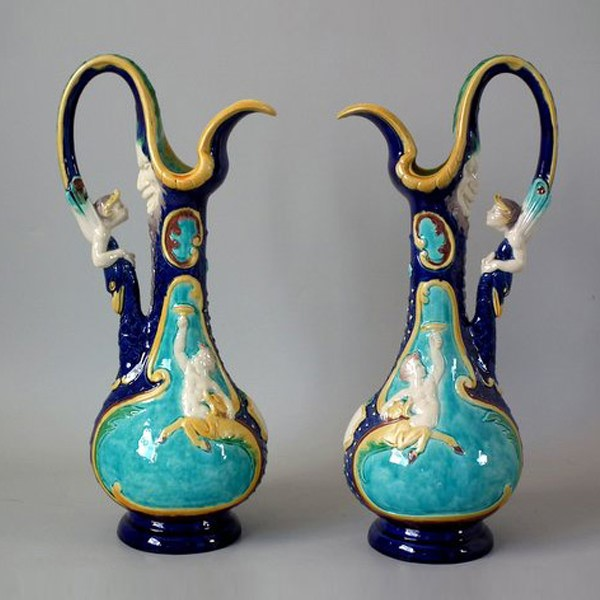
Ewers, coloured glazes, c. 1880, Renaissance in style
- Edge, Malkin & Co, Burslem

=== Royal Worcester ===
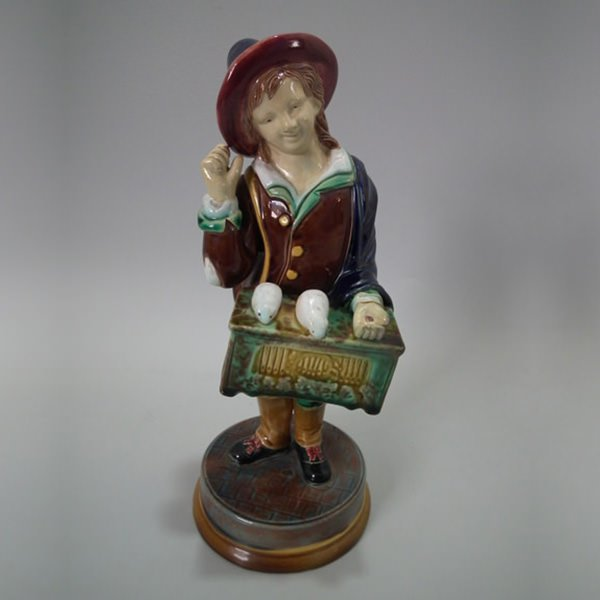
Coloured glazes majolica organ grinder figure, 9.3 in, c. 1870

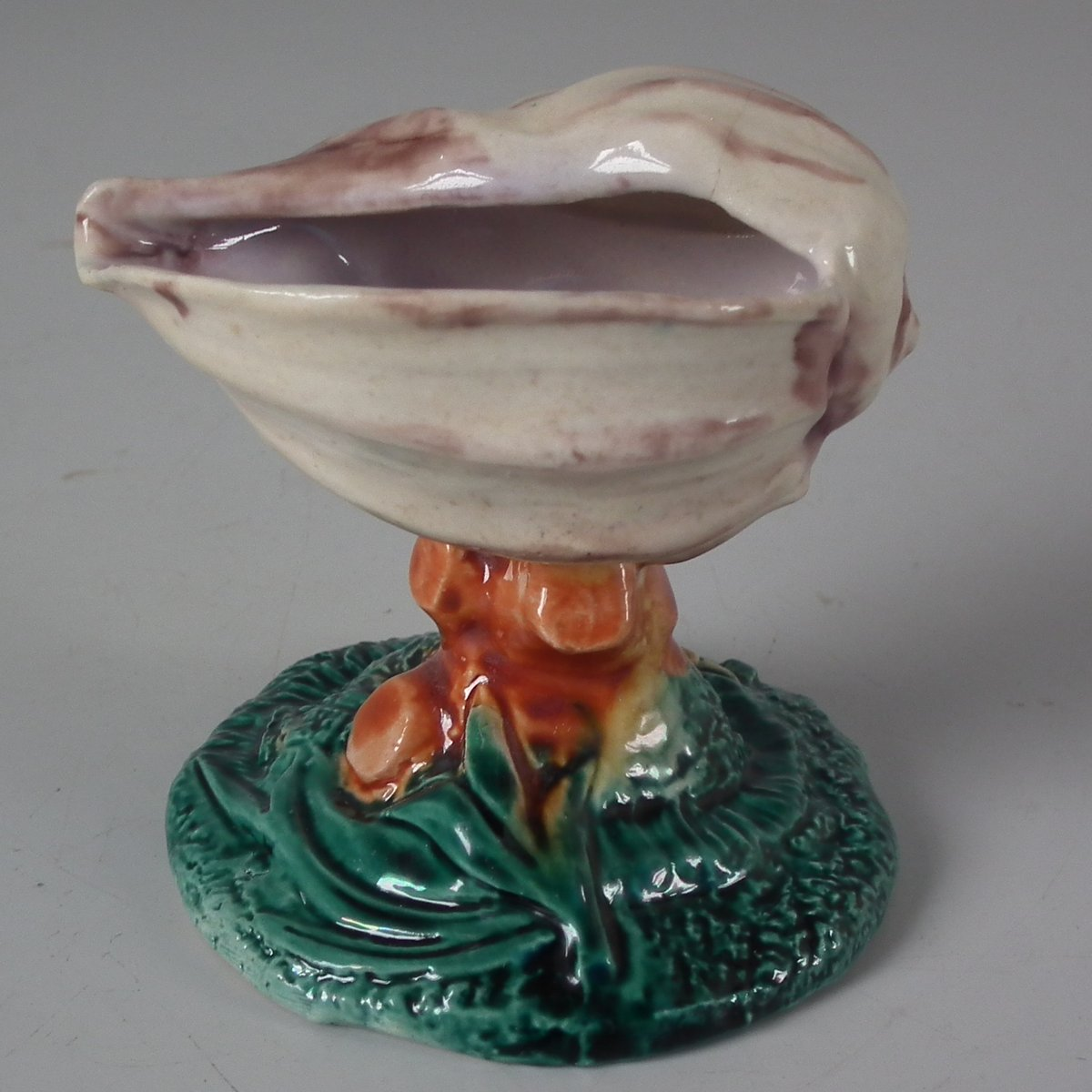
Salt, coloured glazes, moulded in relief, c. 1880, naturalistic shell

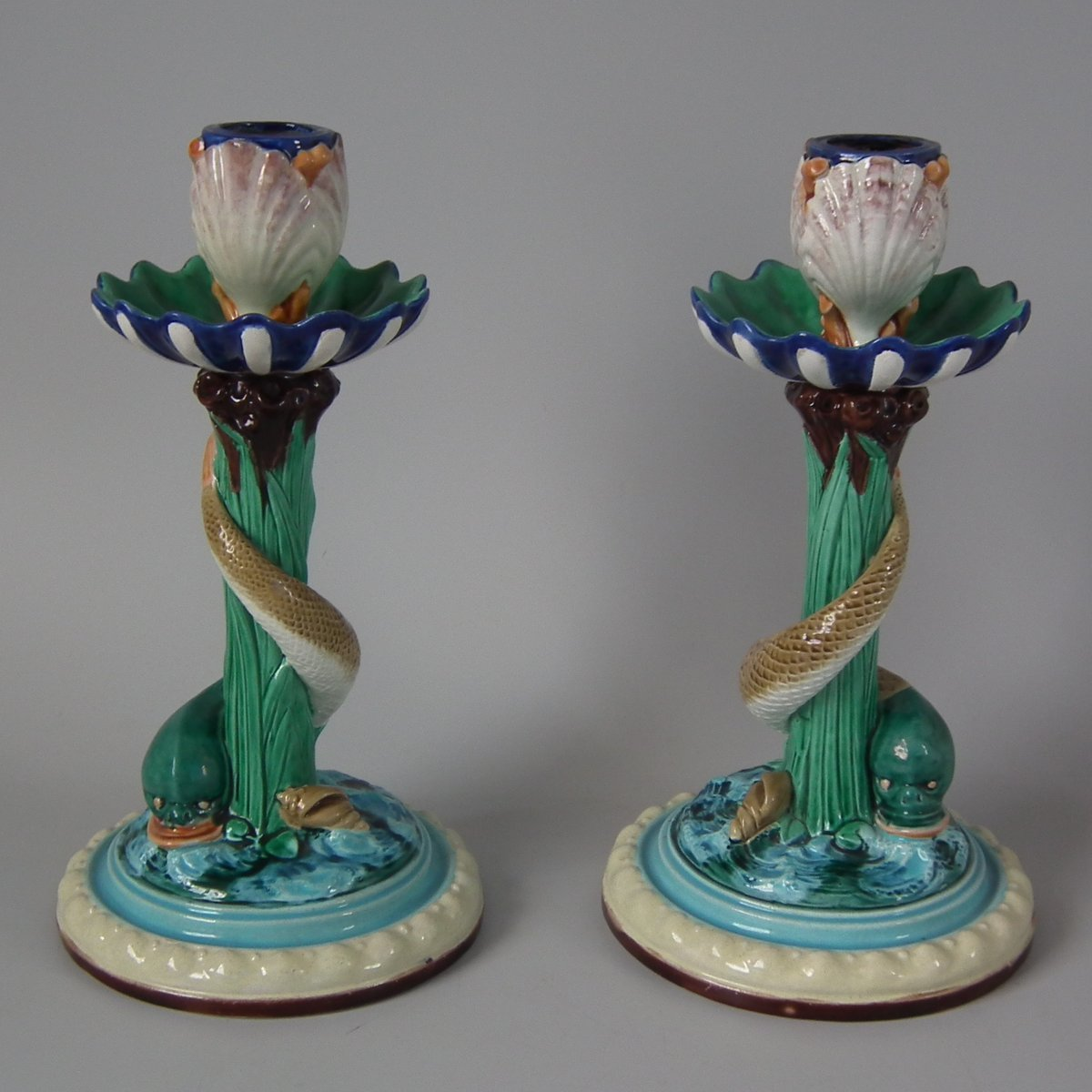
Candlesticks, coloured glazes, moulded in relief, c. 1880, naturalistic in style with historical references

=== Doulton Lambeth ===
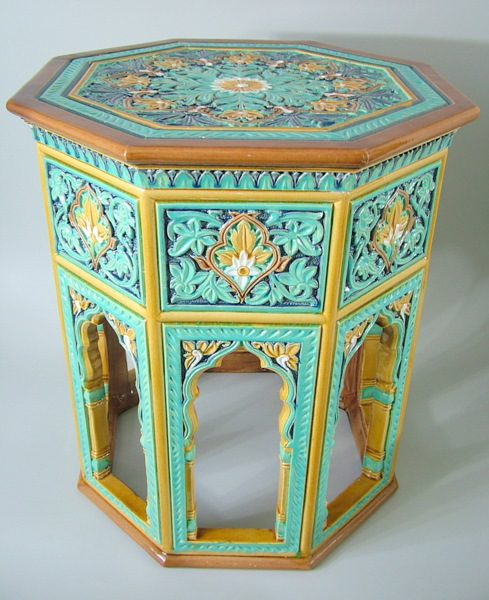
Doulton Lambeth Conservatory table, 18.5 in, coloured glazes majolica, c. 1870, Indian subcontinent in style, a reminder of Empire

=== Victoria Pottery Company ===
- Victoria Pottery
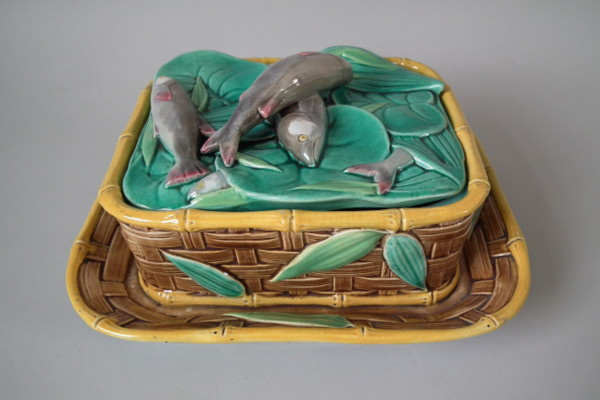
VPC Victoria Pottery Company Sardine Box and cover, 7.9 in, coloured glazes majolica, c. 1880

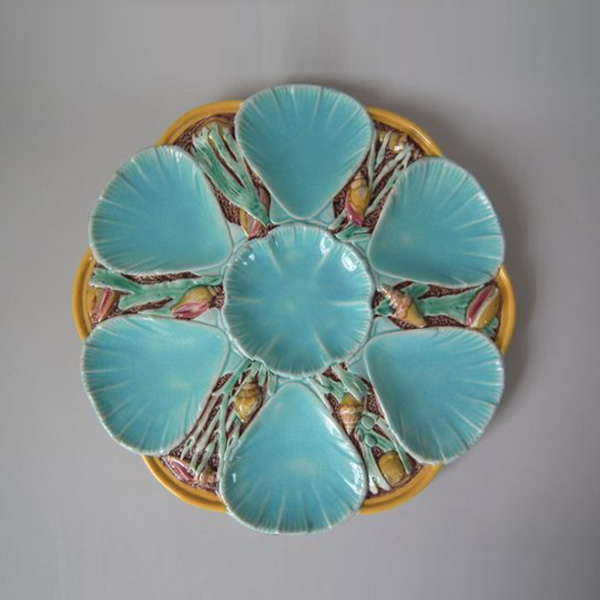
VPC Victoria Pottery Company Oyster plate, 10 in, coloured glazes majolica, c. 1880

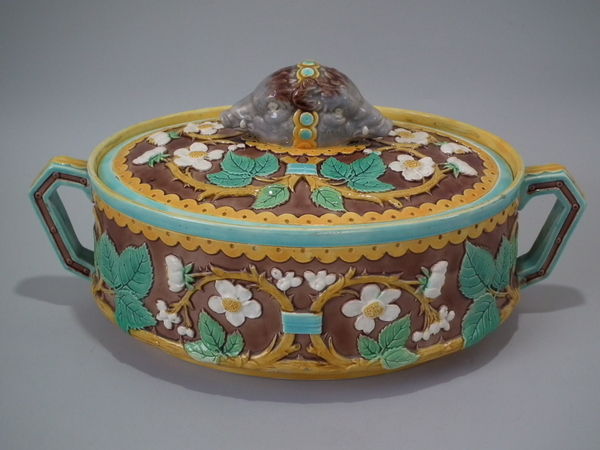
Victoria Pottery Company Pie dish and cover, coloured glazes, c. 1880

=== John Roth ===
- J. Roth
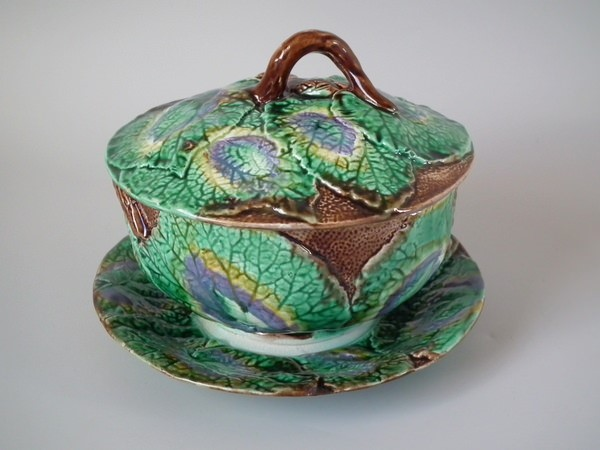
J.R.L. John Roth of London Pot and cover, coloured glazes majolica, c. 1880, begonia leaf design

== European and American makers ==
Majolica from other countries is included in this article for two reasons:

1. The term Victorian is occasionally used also to describe majolica made in other countries.
2. European and American makers employed English immigrant technicians and copied Minton's Victorian coloured glazes majolica process and styles.

=== France ===
APT

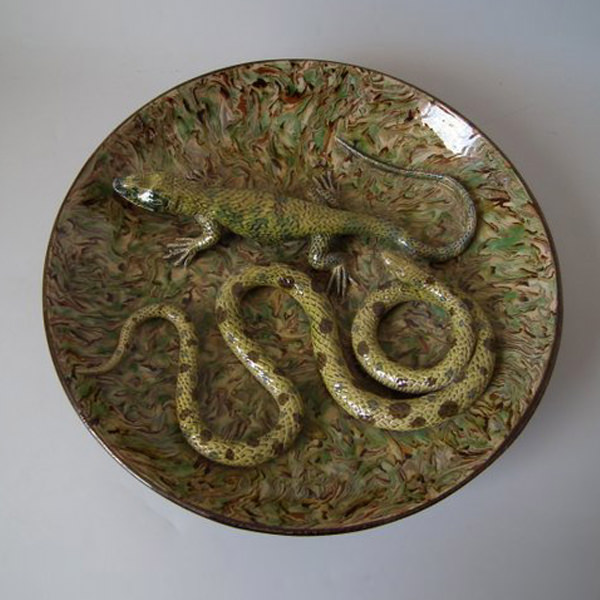
Wall plate, c. 1900, coloured and mottled glazes in Palissy style

Barbizet

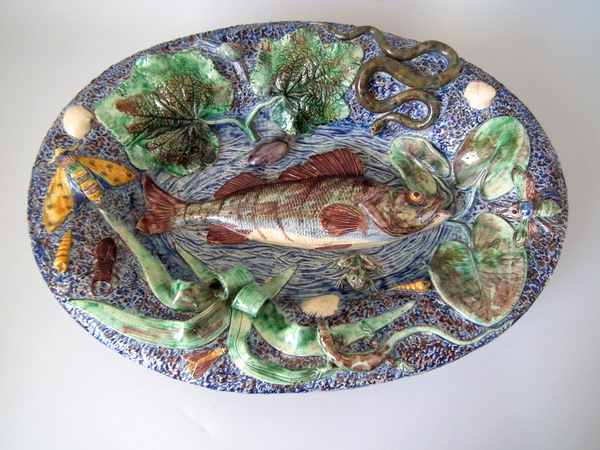
Palissy wall plate, coloured lead glazes on biscuit, c. 1870

Brard

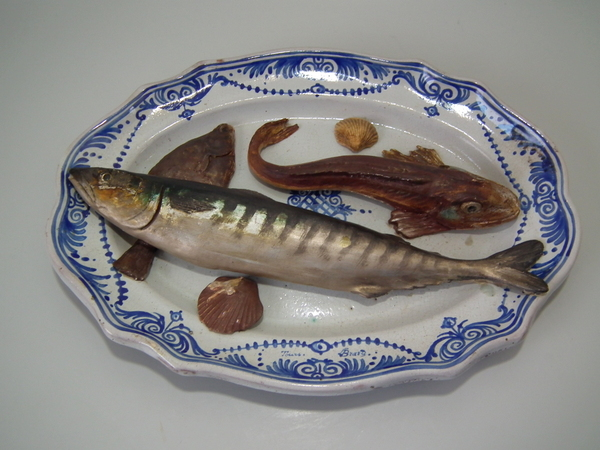
Palissy majolica c. 1880. Platter is opaque white tin-glazed with cobalt oxide brush-painted decoration, and the applied fish are of coloured glazes majolica.

Delphin Massier

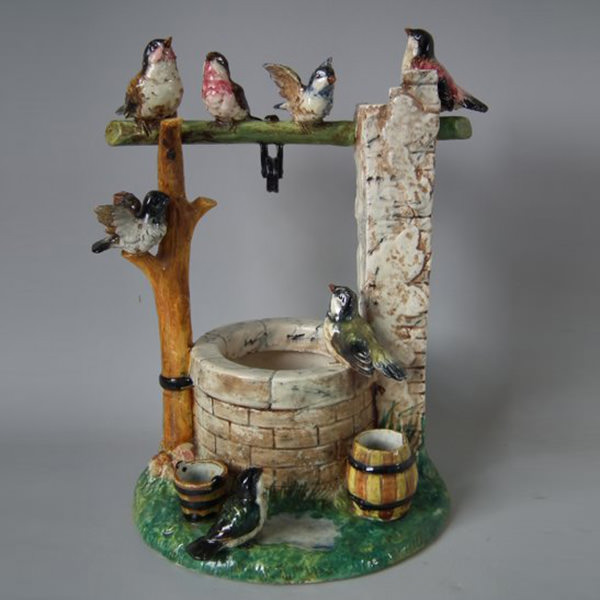
'Birds and Well', 13.6 in, coloured glazes majolique, c. 1880

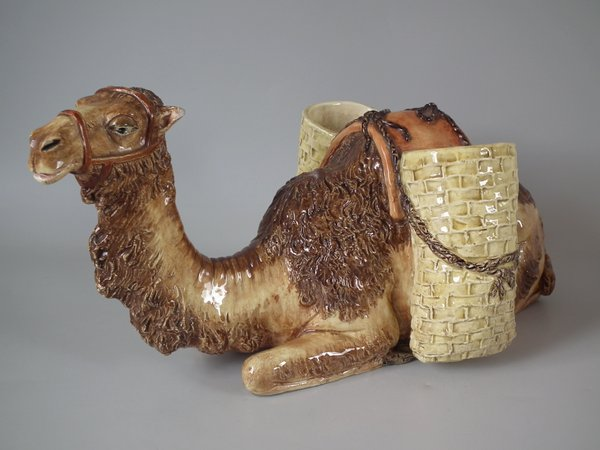
Posy Vase, 14.6 in, coloured glazes, c. 1900

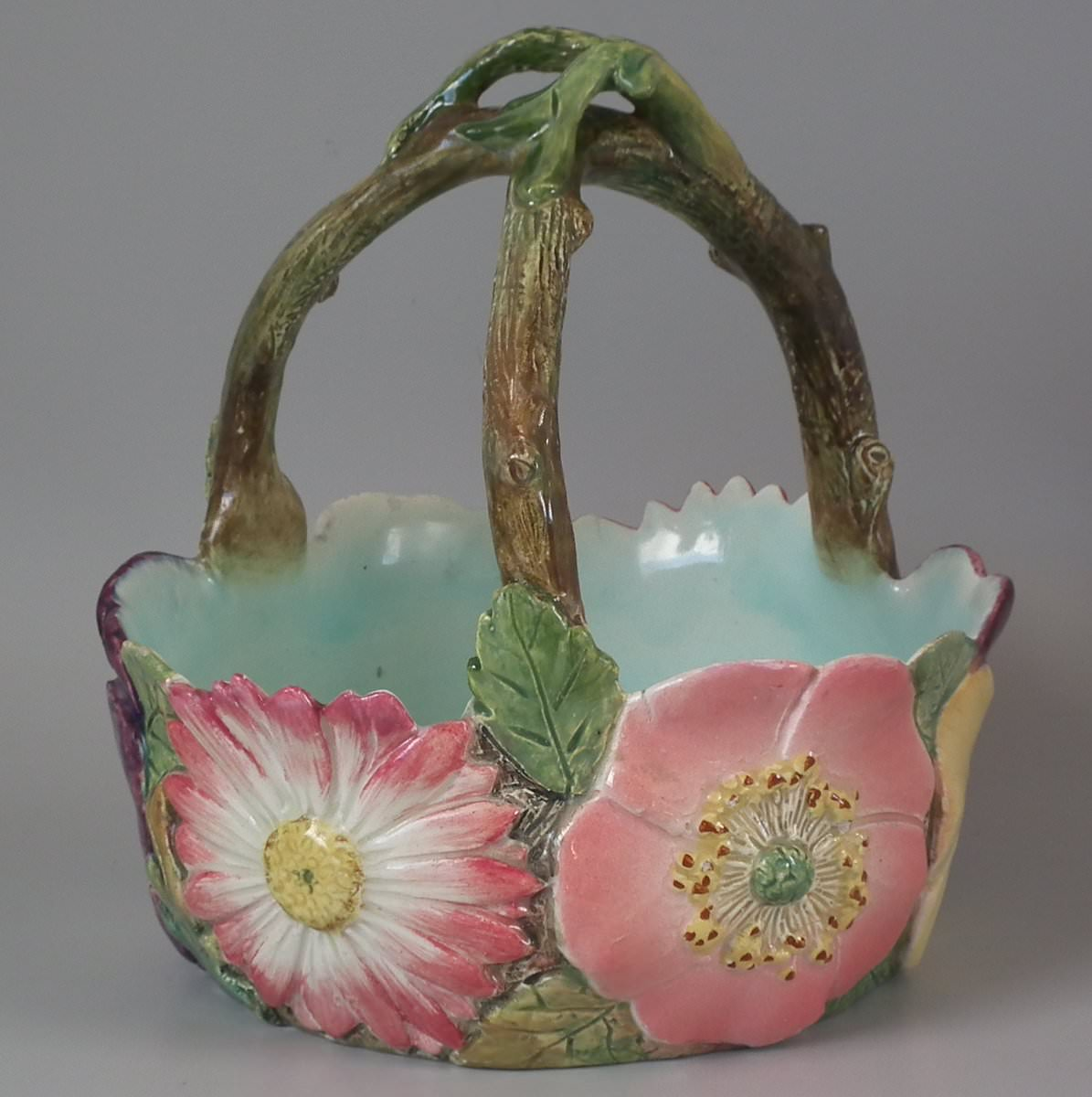
Coloured glazes majolica basket, c. 1900

Perret-Gentil

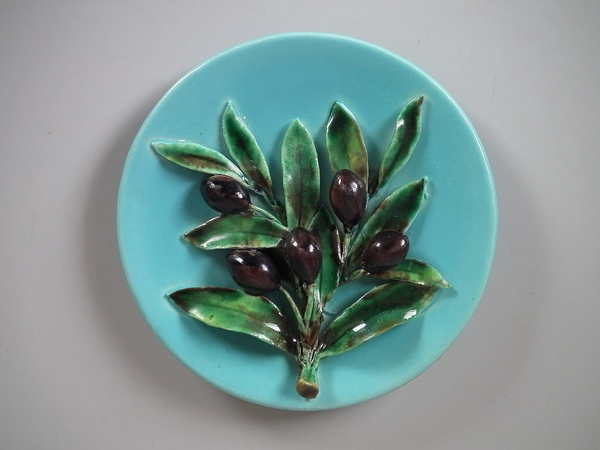
Perret Gentil Menton coloured lead glazes majolica plate

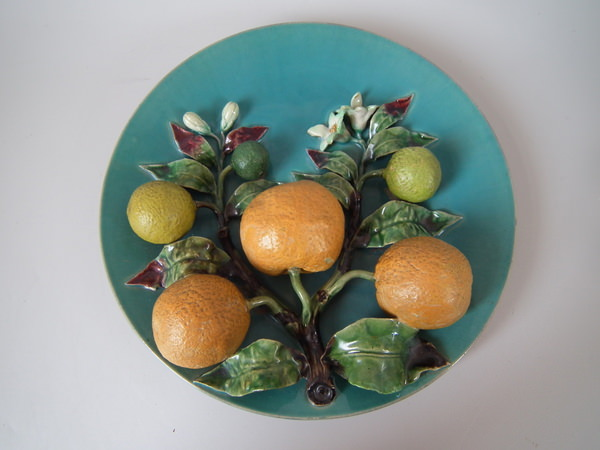
Wall Plate, 9.6 in, coloured glazes, Palissy style, Menton, France

Sarreguemines
La majolique

"A la fin des années 1870 apparaît un produit qui renforce la notoriété de Sarreguemines en Europe:la majolique. Il s'agit d'une faïence fine recouverte de glaçures colorées. Les couleurs privilégiées: le gros bleu, le bleu turquoise, le vert dit bronze. Les bibelots, « objets de fantaisie » ainsi que certaines pièces monumentales bénéficient largement de cette nouvelle technique."

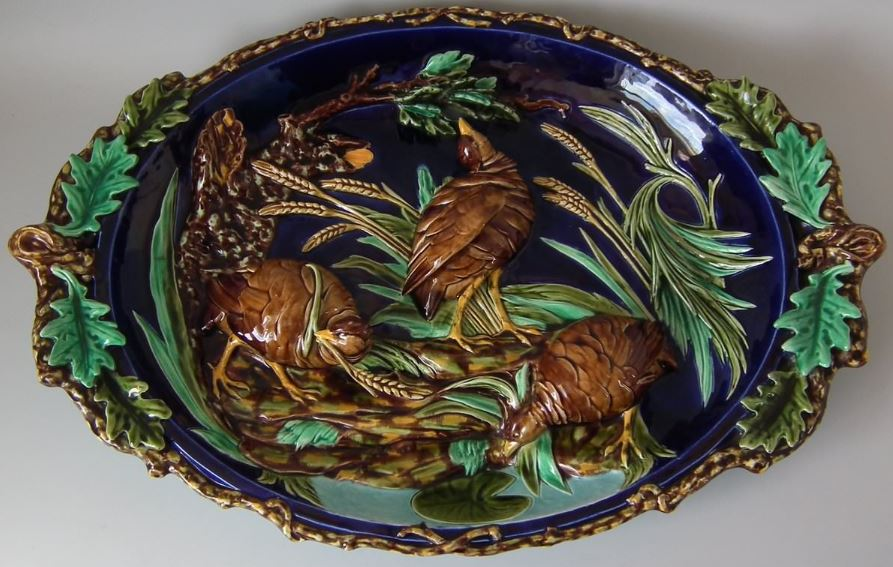
Coloured glazes Sarreguemines majolica partridges plaque

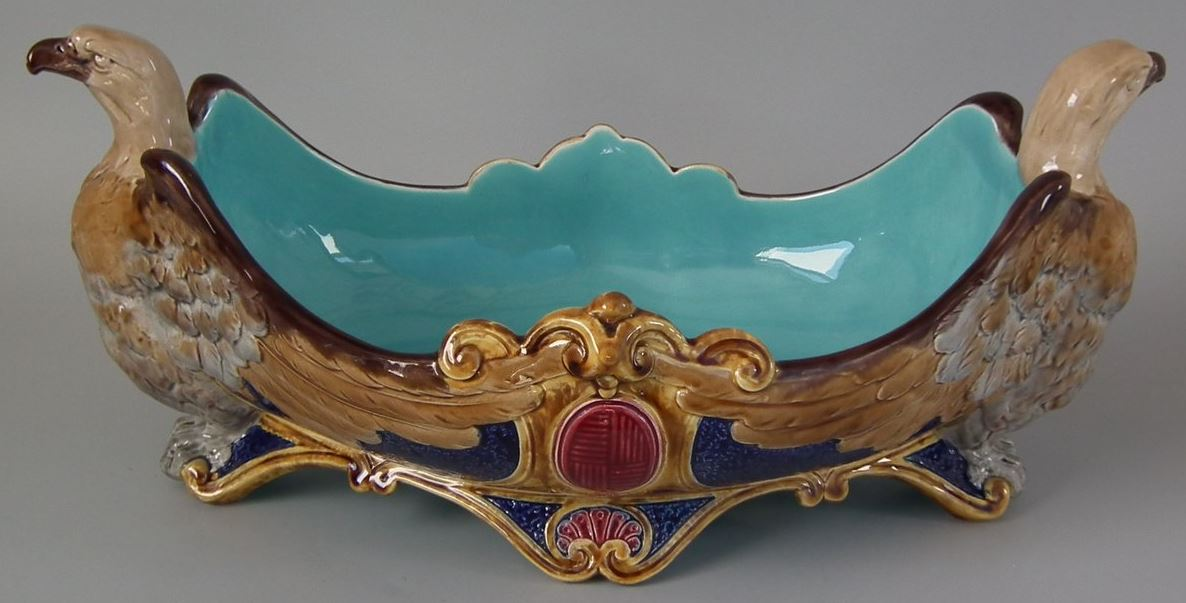
Sarreguemines Majolica Eagles bowl, 16 in

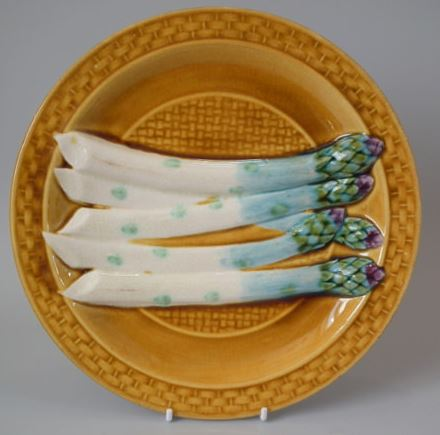
Asparagus plate, c. 1880

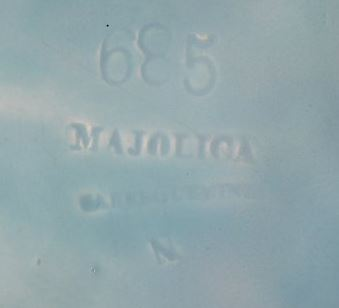
Sarreguemines Majolica makers mark

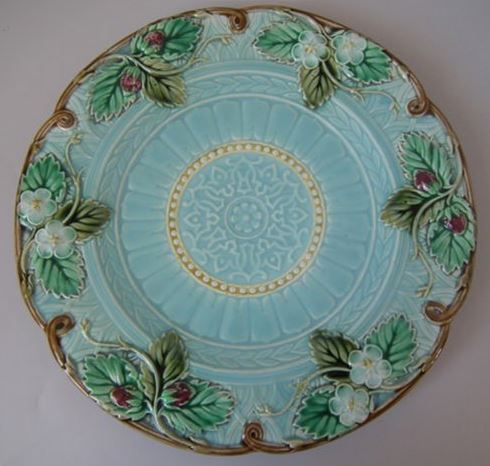
Sarreguemines Majolica Majolique Strawberry plate, c. 1880

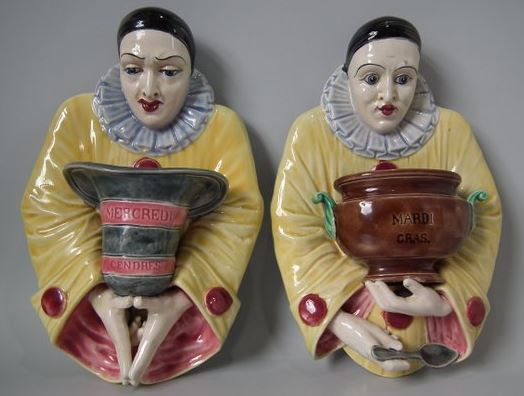
Sarreguemines Majolica Majolique 'Mardis Gras' Wall Pockets, c. 1890

Thomas Sergent

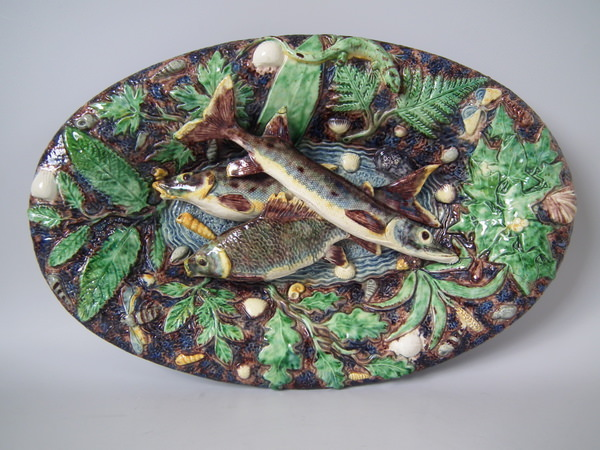
Thomas Sergent Platter, c. 1875, coloured glazes, ultra-naturalistic Palissy style

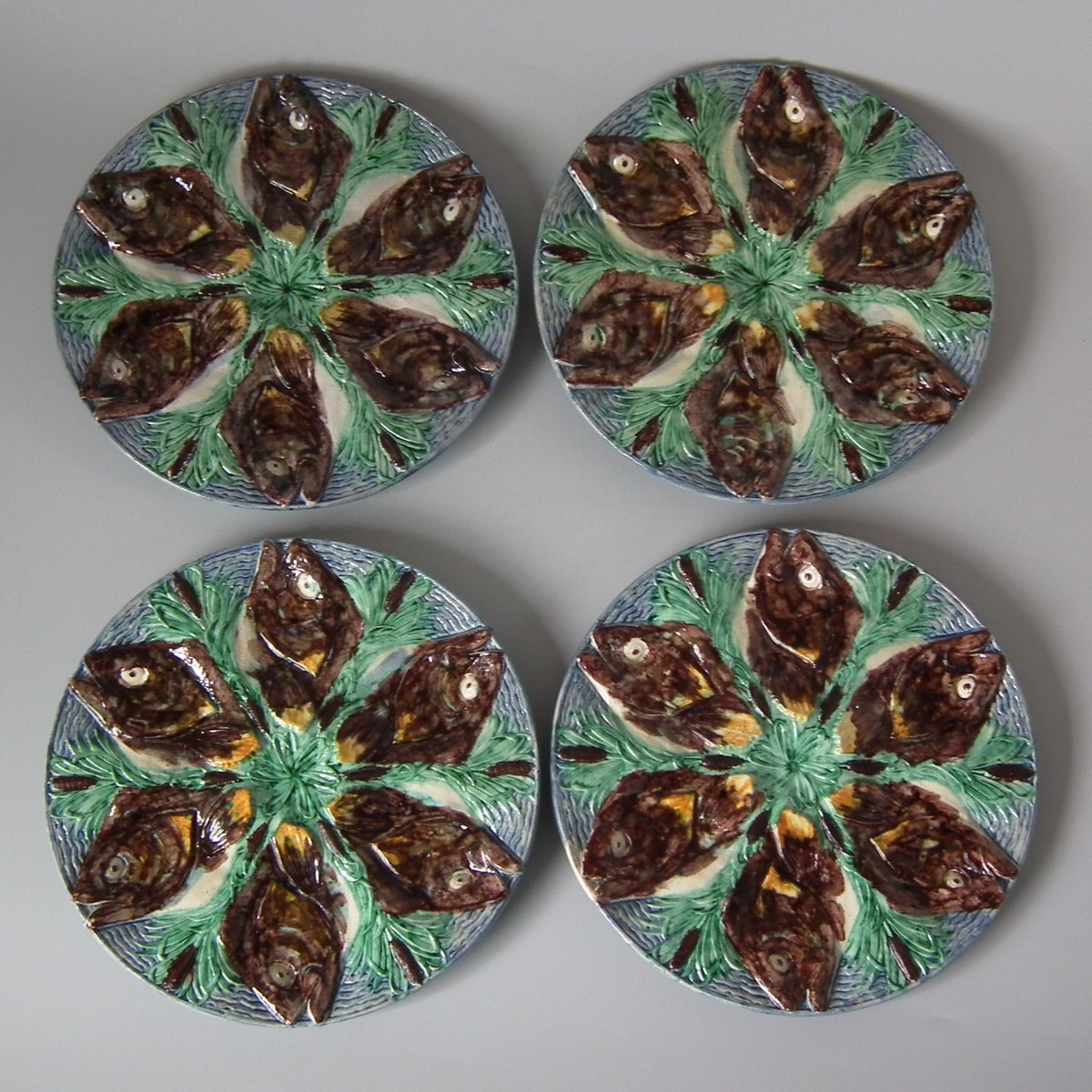
Oyster plates, c. 1880, coloured glazes, Palissy style

Choisy le Roi

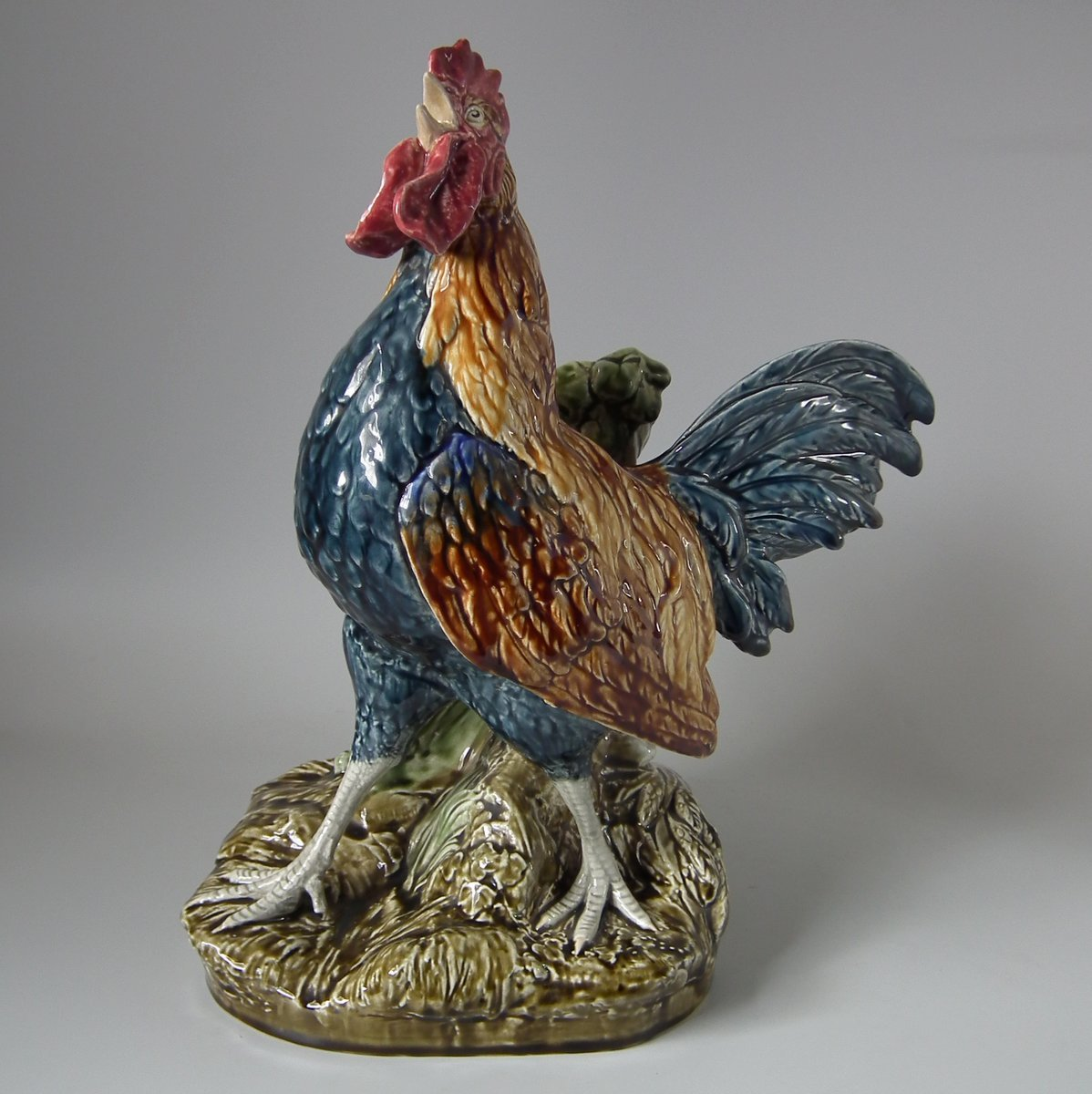
Cockerel (Rooster), 14.6 in, coloured glazes, c. 1880

Boch Freres

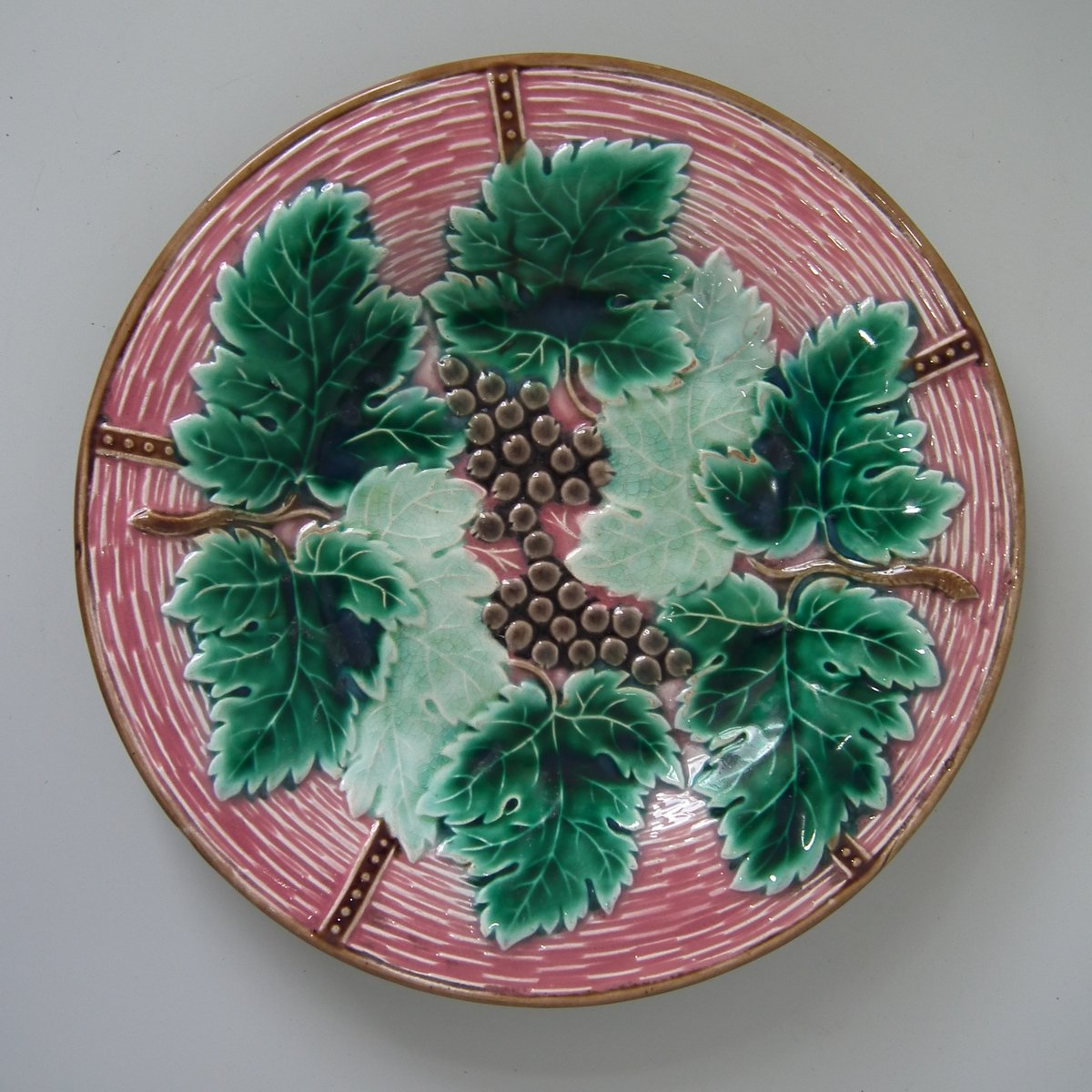
Boch Freres Kermis Plate, coloured glazes, c. 1880, grapes and vine leaves pattern

Longchamp

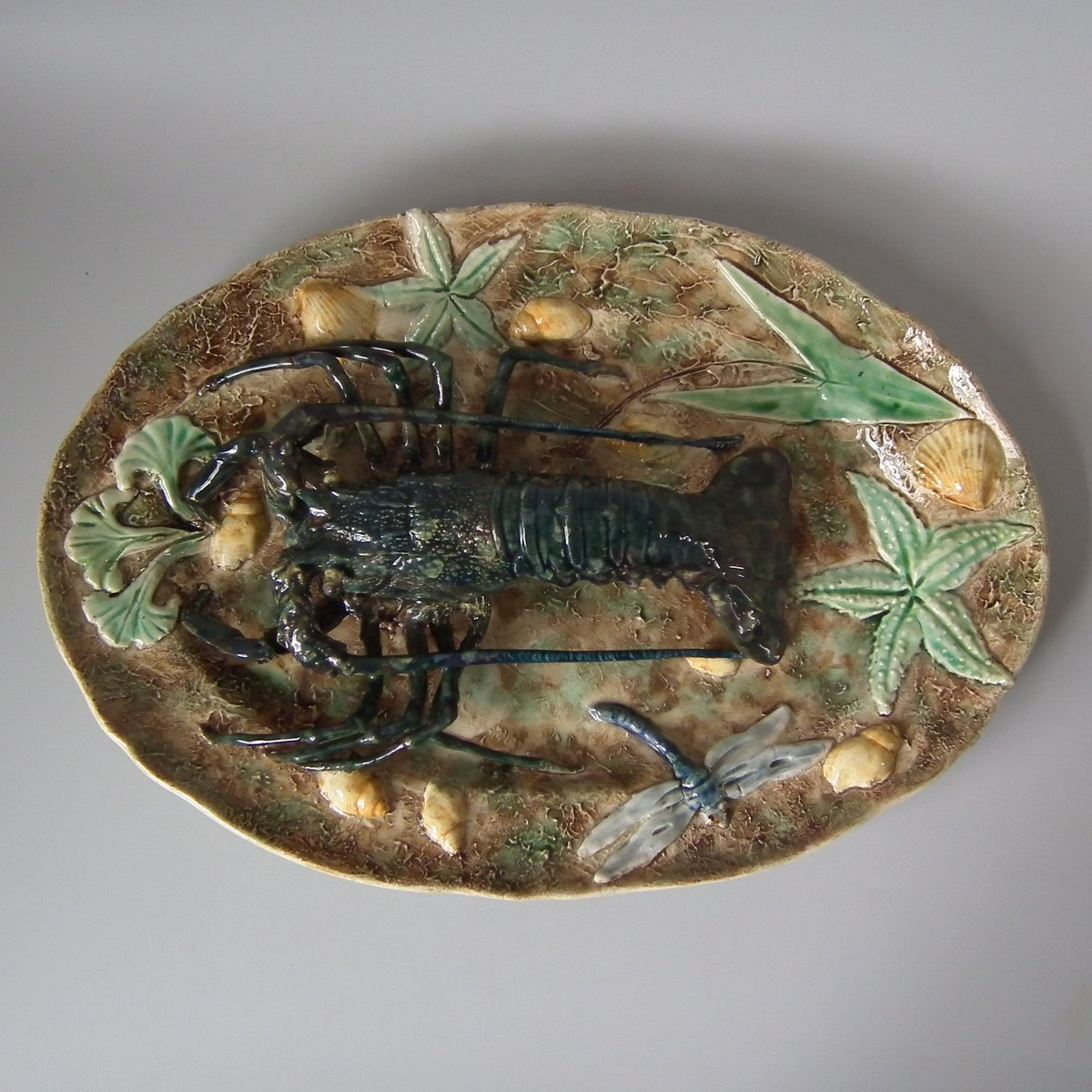
Coloured glazes majolica lobster platter 18.9 in, c. 1880.

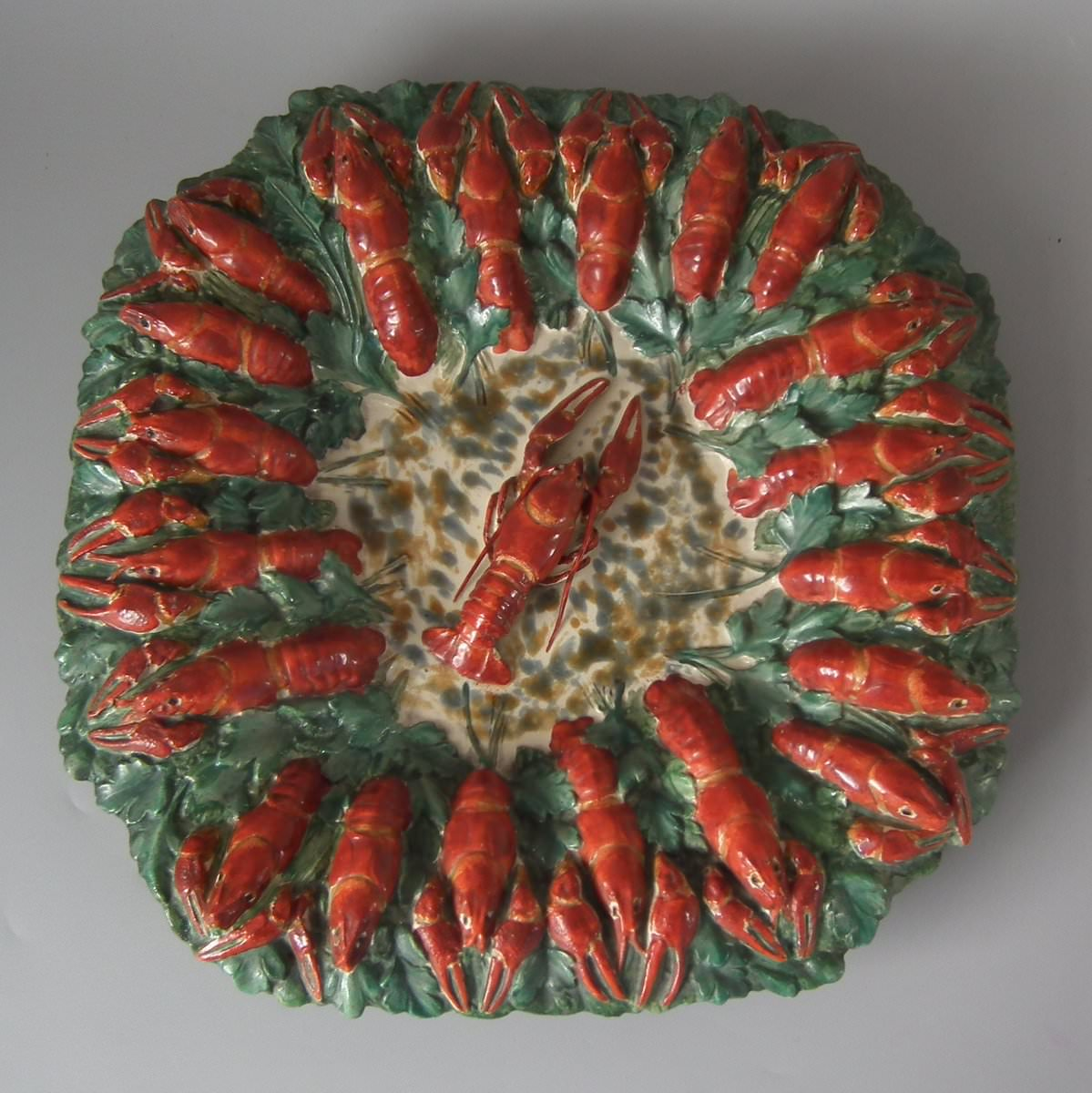
Coloured glazes majolica lobsters dish wall plaque, c. 1880

Luneville

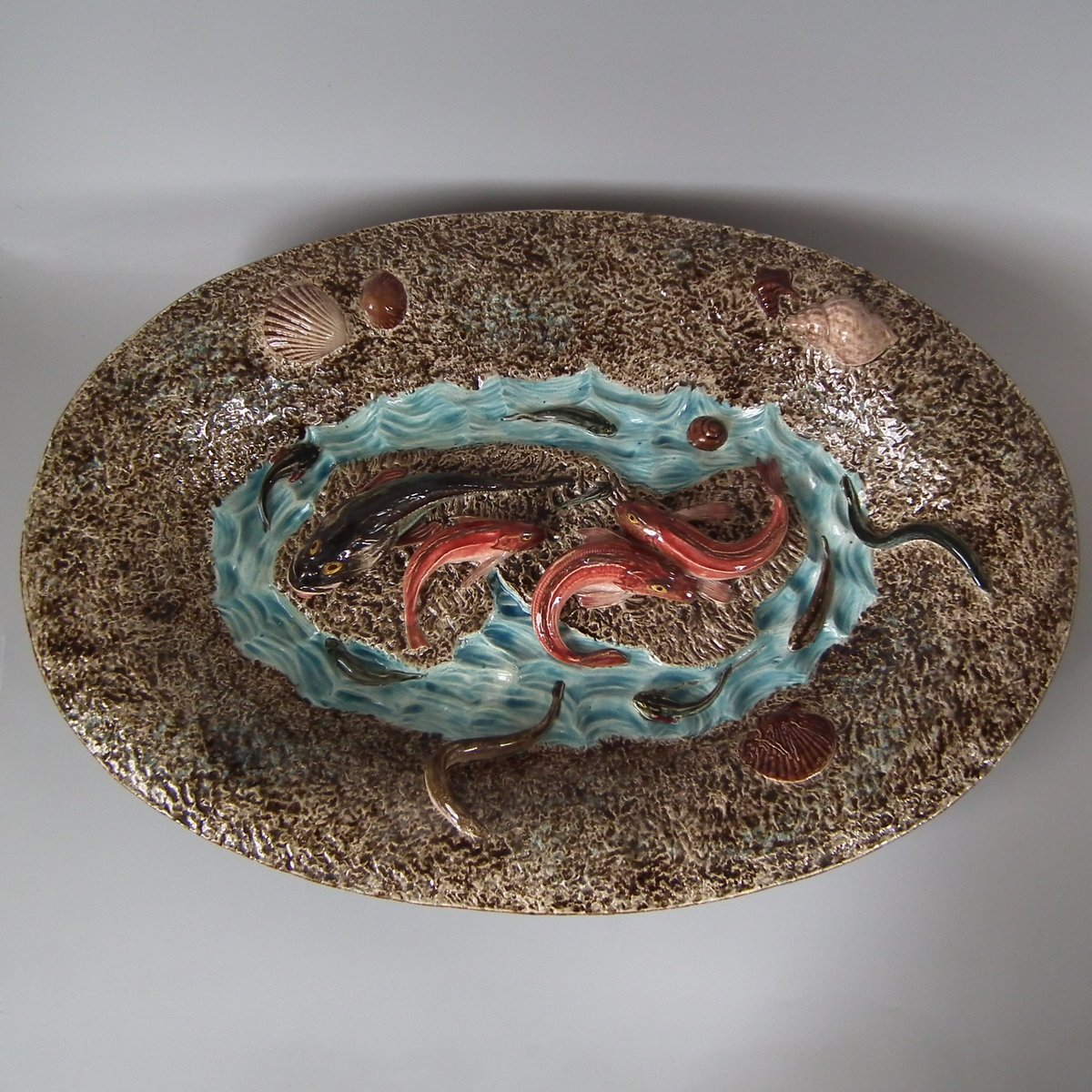
22.4 in coloured glazes majolica marine platter, c. 1880.

Orchies

Nimy

Onnaing

Salins

Vallauris

=== Portugal ===
Augusta Baptista de Carvalho

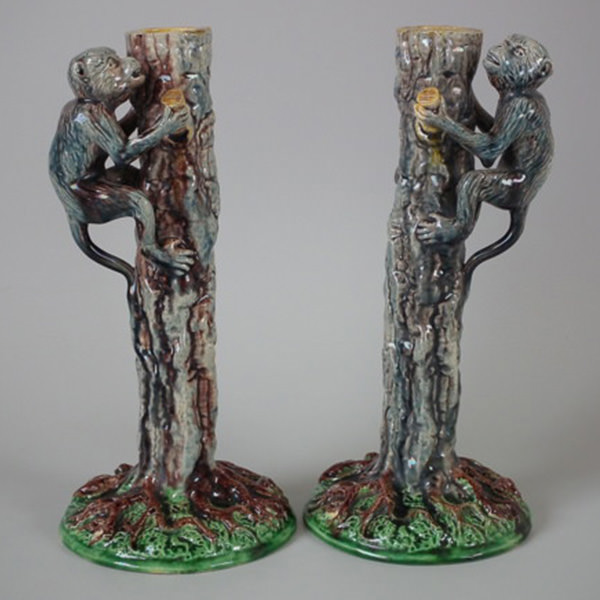
Candlesticks, 9.4 in, coloured glazes, Palissy style

Avelena Soares

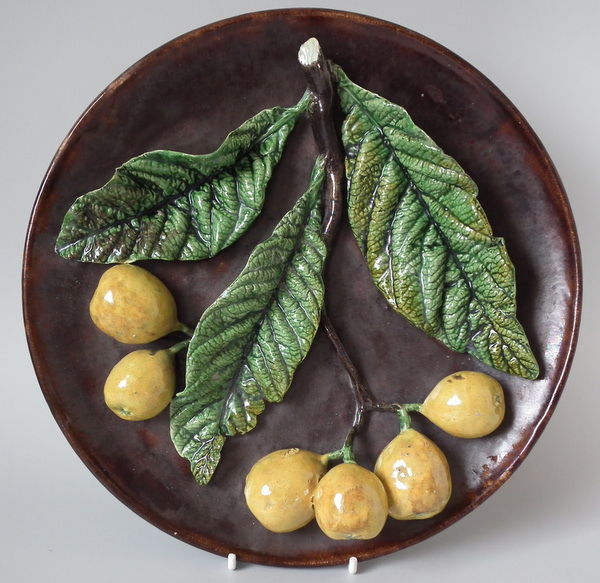
Wall plate, 10.4 in, coloured glazes, ultra-naturalistic Palissy style

Bordalo Pinheiro

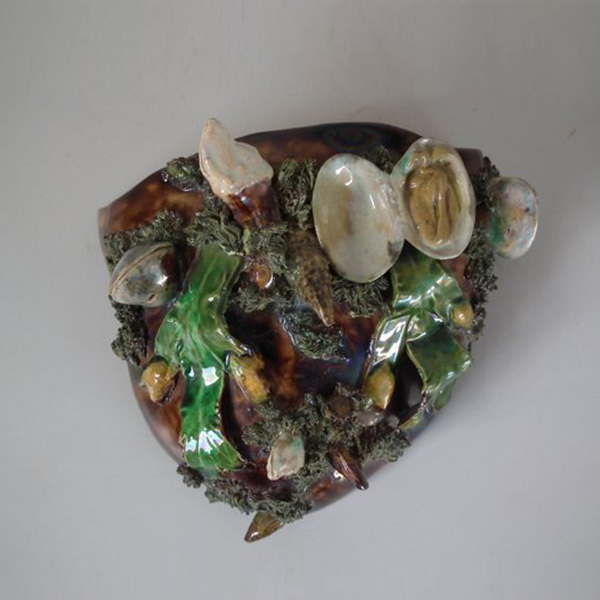
Wall pocket, coloured glazes, c. 1888, shellfish and seaweed Palissy majolica

Cunha

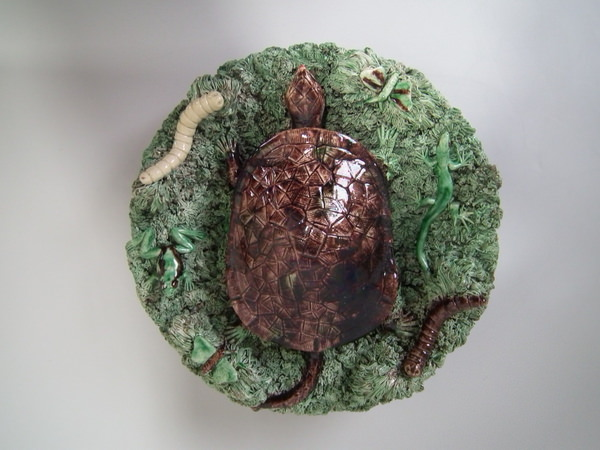
Wall plate, 11 in, coloured glazes, Palissy style

José Francisco de Sousa

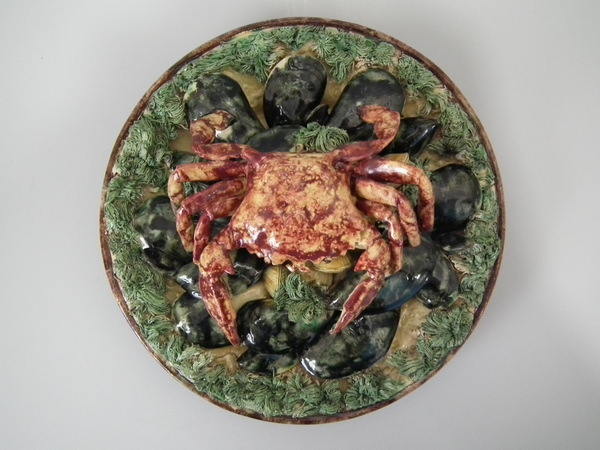
Wall plate, 10.4 in, coloured glazes, Palissy style

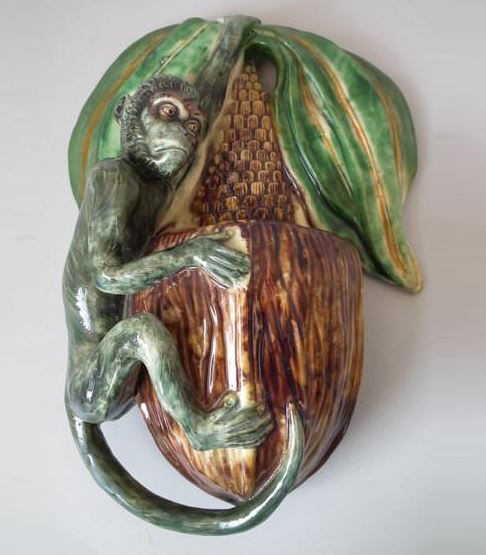
Coloured glazes palissy majolica wall pocket, c. 1890

Manuel Cipriano Gomes Mafra

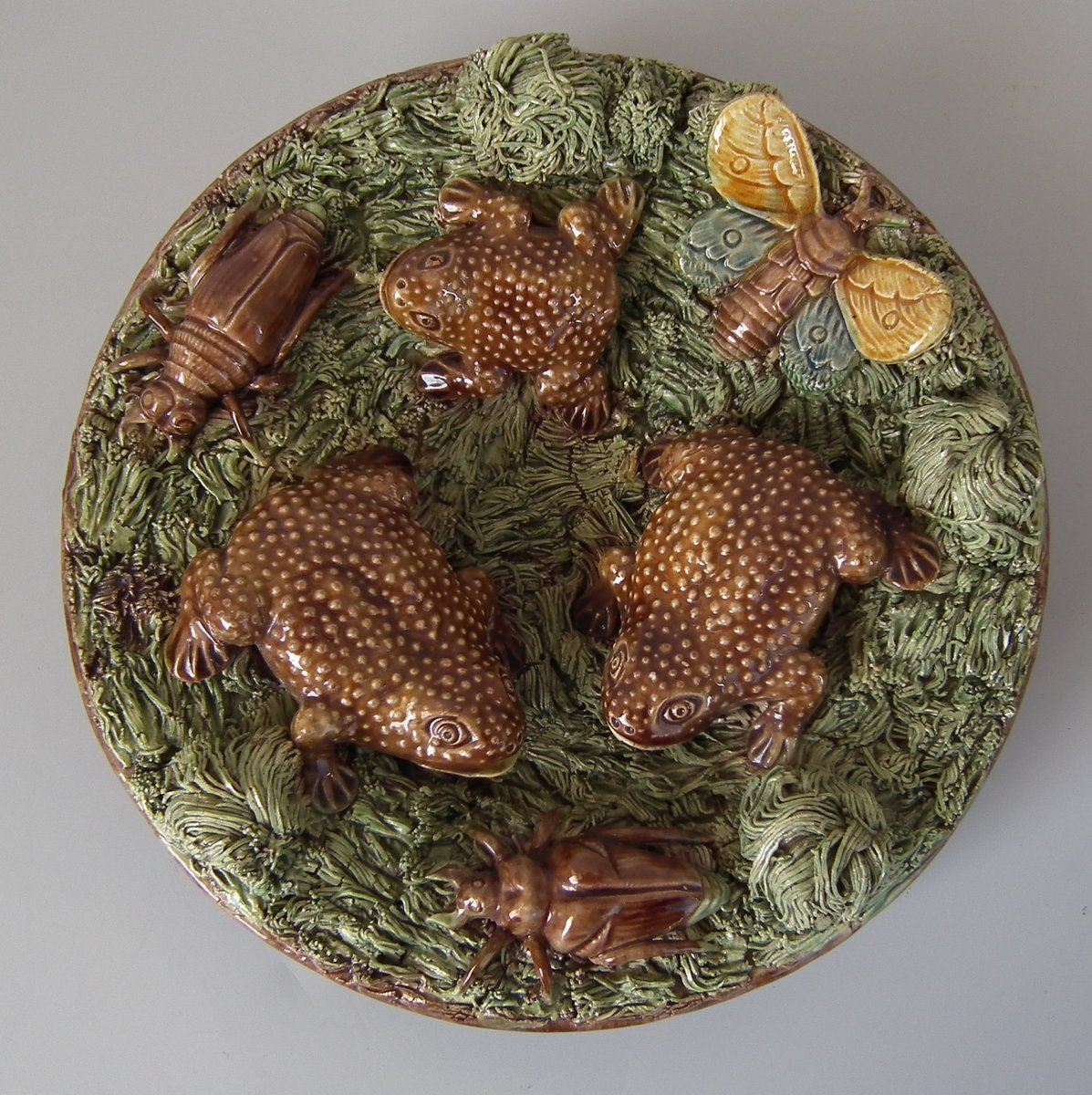
Coloured glazes palissy majolica toads and pond life wall plate, c. 1890

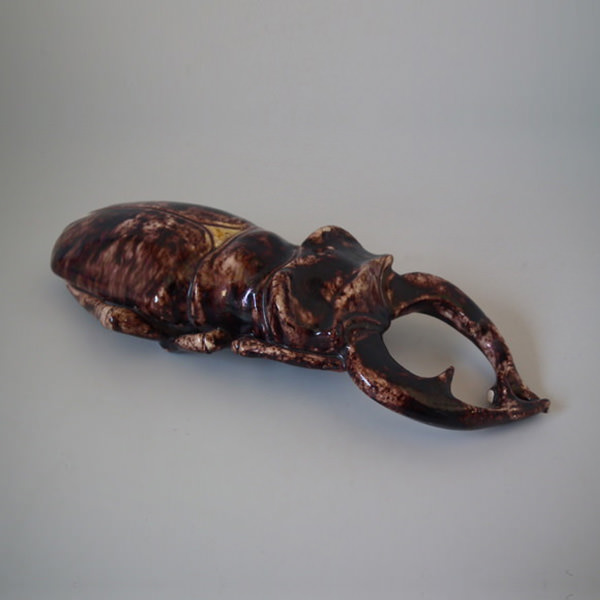
Coloured glazes palissy majolica beetle wall ornament, 3.1 in, c. 1890

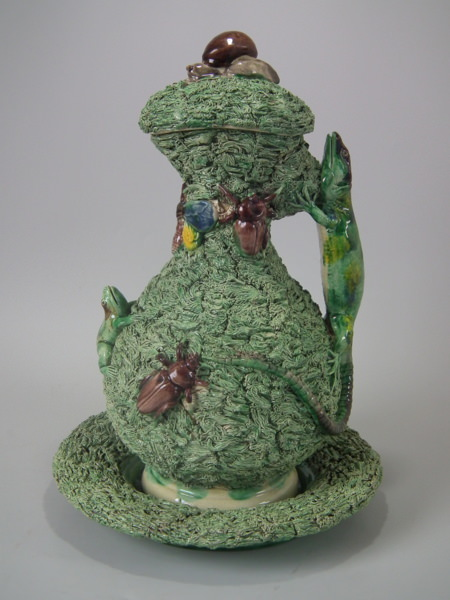
Ewer, cover, and stand, 13.6 in, c. 1870, ultra-naturalistic Palissy majolica

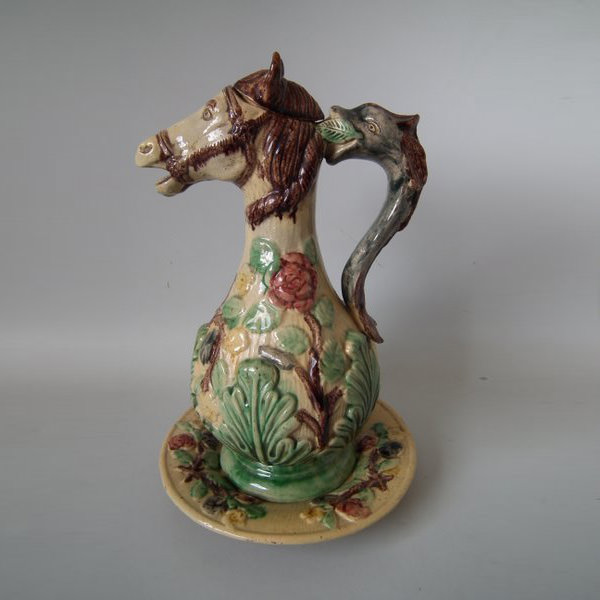
Horse Ewer, 14.6 in, coloured glazes, Palissy style

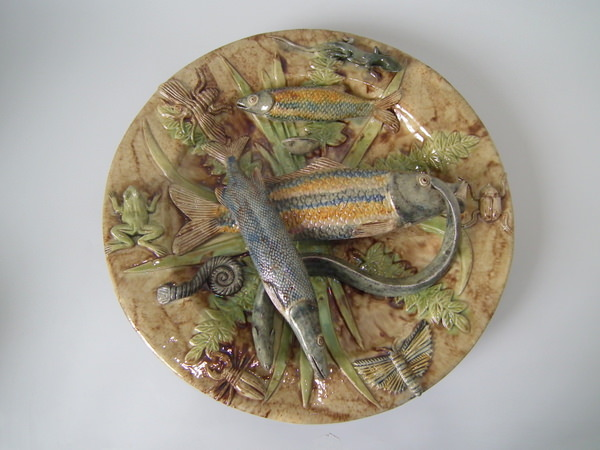
Wall plate, 15.2 in, coloured glazes, Palissy style

=== Germany ===
Krause (Germany, now in Poland) Reichard Krause, quality German maker late 19th century, coloured majolica glazes, styles classical and naturalistic, usually with clear K/M shield makers marks.

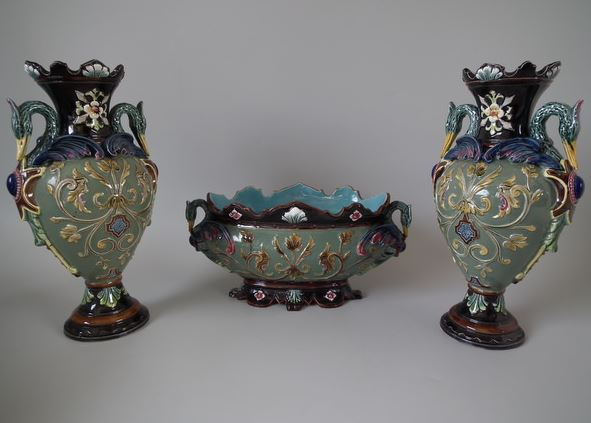
Coloured glazes majolica jardinière and vases, c. 1890

Eichwald

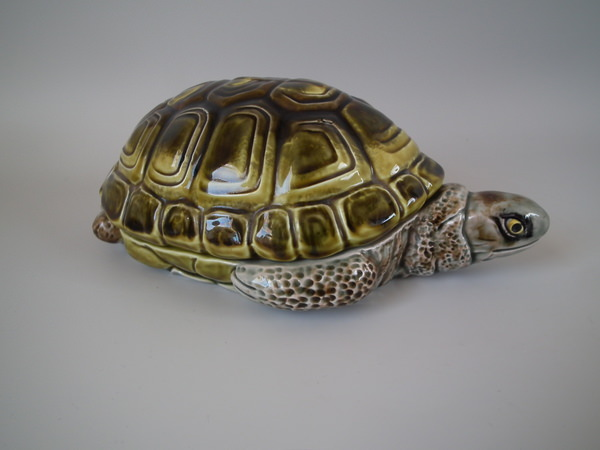
Trinket box, 9.4 in, coloured glazes majolica, c. 1890

Bloch, Villeroy & Boch (Luxemburg)

W S Schiller

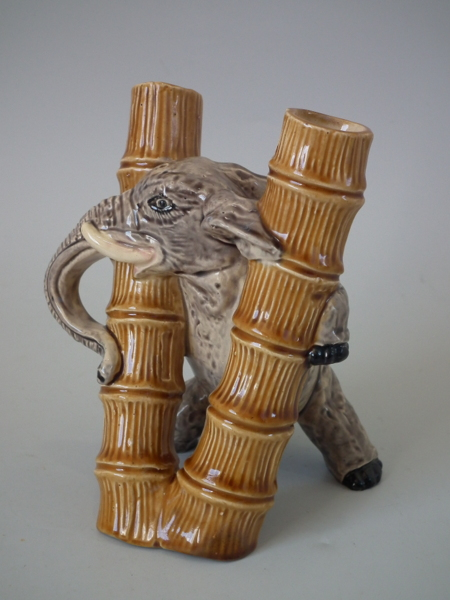
Spill Vase, coloured glazes, c. 1890

=== Austria ===
Hugo Lonitz

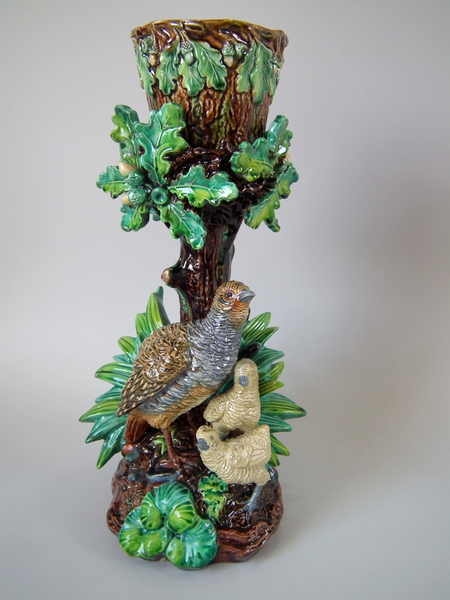
Lonitz, 1880, naturalistic, molded in relief, coloured glazes.

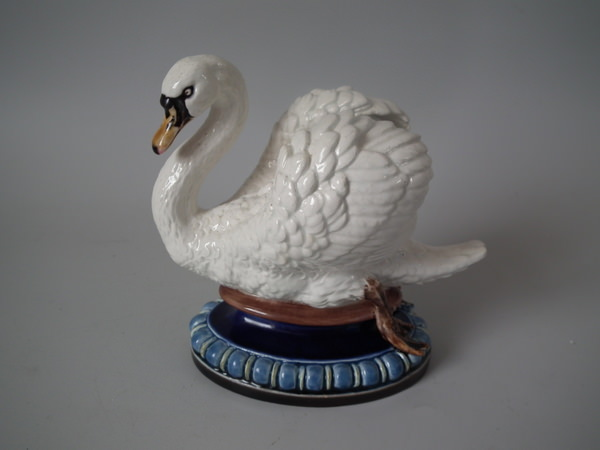
Lonitz Swan figure, coloured glazes majolica, c. 1870

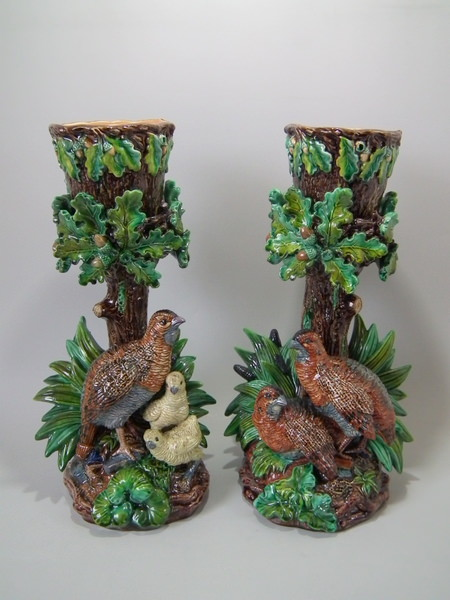
Cache pots and stands, coloured glazes, c. 1880

=== Sweden ===
Gustafsberg

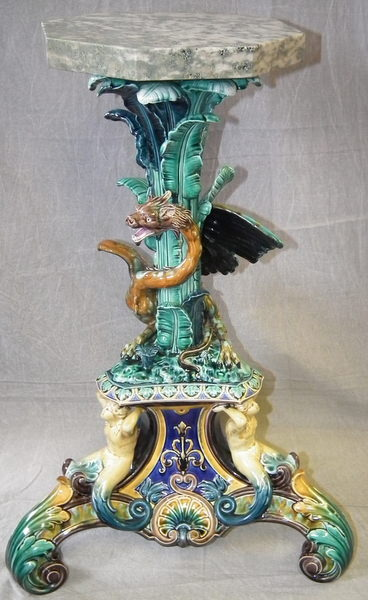
Gustafsberg Jardiniere Stand, coloured glazes, c. 1878, naturalistic with mythological theme, Sweden

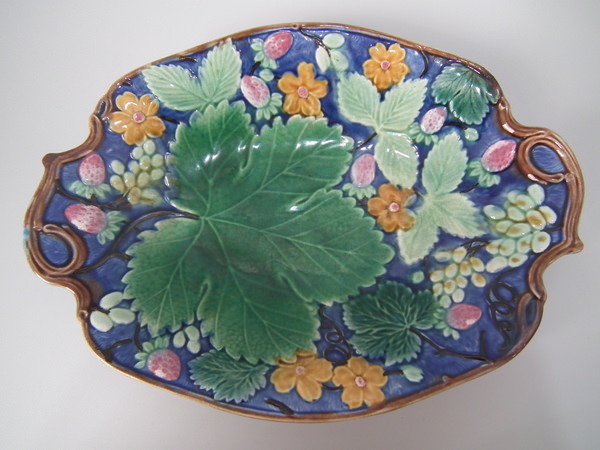
Gustafsberg Dessert service platter, coloured glazes, c. 1880, naturalistic theme, Sweden

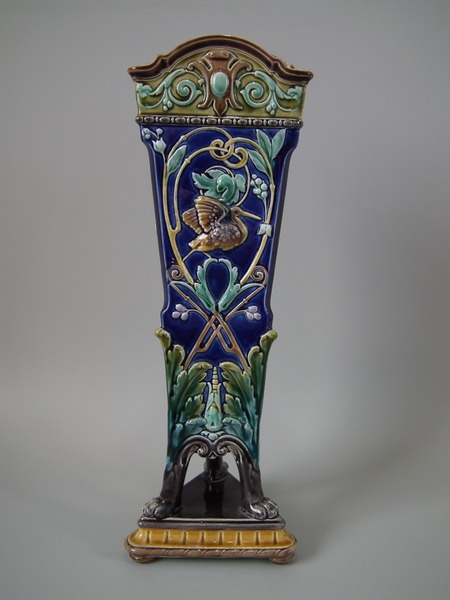
Coloured lead glazes majolica Gustafsberg vase, c. 1880

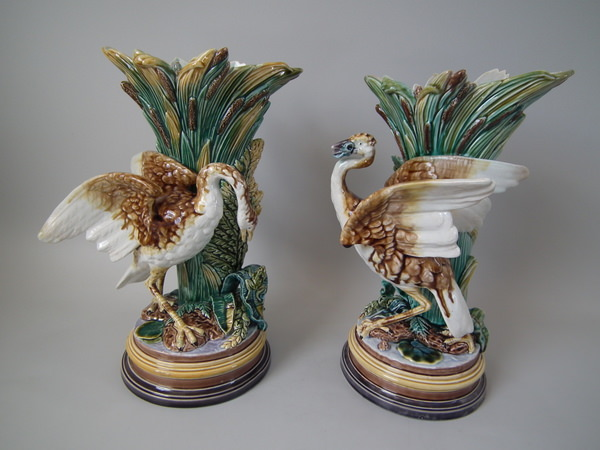
Bird Vases, 1887, Sweden. Coloured glazes, naturalistic in style.

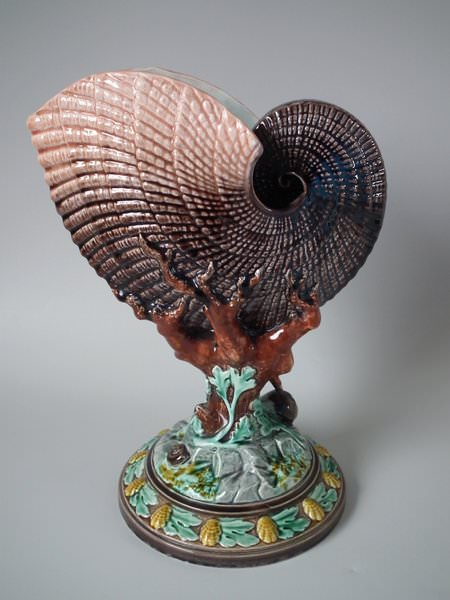
Nautilus shell Vase, 1899, Sweden. Coloured glazes, naturalistic in style.

Rörstrand

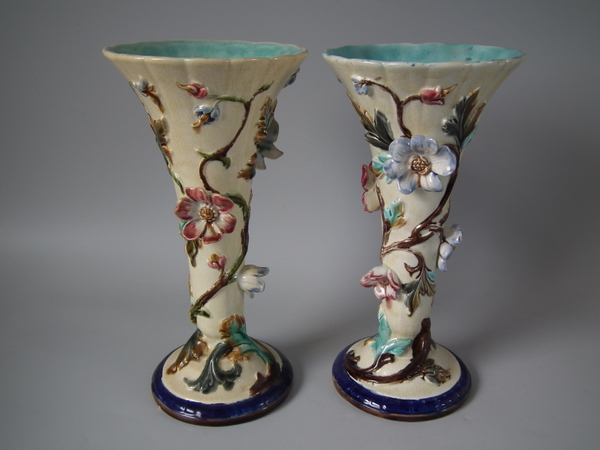
Vases, c. 1880. Coloured glazes, naturalistic in style.

=== America ===
Several American firms also made majolica, with the English born Edwin Bennett producing it in Baltimore as early as the 1850s. The best known are Griffin, Smith and Hill of Phoenixville, Pennsylvania, whose Etruscan majolica made from 1880 to 1890 includes compotes with dolphin supports and flower, shell, or jewel cups, a design of coral weed and seashells, and tableware with leaves and ferns. Their mark was an impressed monogram, "G.S.H.", sometimes circled and with the words "Etruscan Majolica".

Majolica was also made by Odell and Booth at Tarrytown, New York, and by the Faience Manufacturing Company at Greenpoint, Long Island, whose mark is an incised "F.M. Co." Their pottery was dipped in coloured glazes, creating a streaked or marbled effect. Majolica was made at Evansville, Indiana. Work from the Chesapeake Pottery in Baltimore was called Clifton Ware and was marked "Clifton Decor 'R'" with the monogram "D.F.H.".

The Arsenal Pottery of Trenton, New Jersey, was making majolica as late as 1900 and exhibited Toby jugs in imitation of English Toby jugs at the World's Columbian Exposition, Chicago (1893).

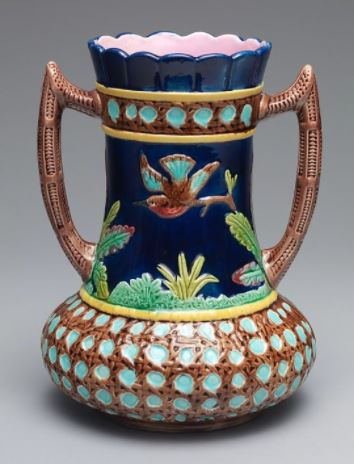
Eureka Pottery coloured glazes majolica, Trenton, New Jersey

== See also ==
- Majolica
- Maiolica
- Tin-glazed pottery
