= Earthenware =

Nonvitreous pottery

Painted, incised and glazed earthenware. Dated 10th century, Iran.
New York Metropolitan Museum of Art

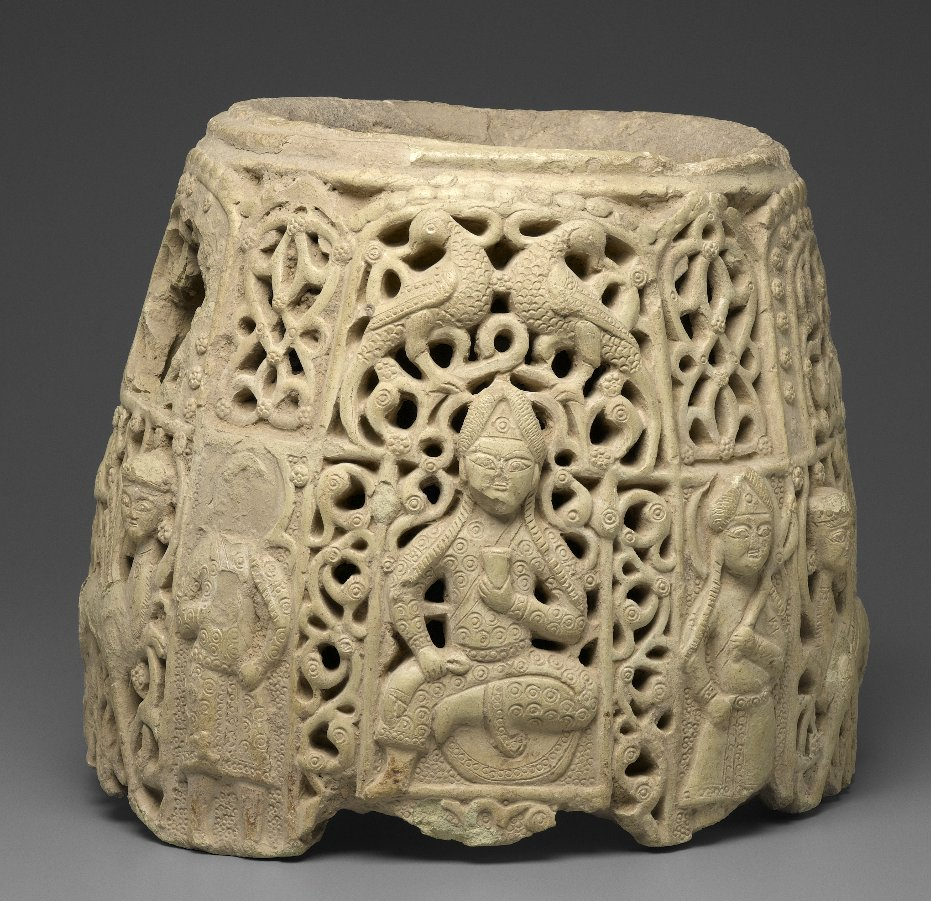
Top section of a water jug or habb. Earthenware. Late 12th-early 13th century Iraq or Syria.
Brooklyn Museum

Earthenware is glazed or unglazed nonvitreous pottery that has normally been fired below 1,200 °C (2,190 °F). Basic earthenware, often called terracotta, absorbs liquids such as water. However, earthenware can be made impervious to liquids by coating it with a ceramic glaze, and such a process is used for the great majority of modern domestic earthenware. The main other important types of pottery are porcelain, bone china, and stoneware, all fired at high enough temperatures to vitrify. End applications include tableware and decorative ware such as figurines.

Earthenware comprises "most building bricks, nearly all European pottery up to the seventeenth century, most of the wares of Egypt, Persia and the near East; Greek, Roman and Mediterranean, and some of the Chinese; and the fine earthenware which forms the greater part of our tableware today" ("today" being 1962). Pit fired earthenware dates back to as early as 29,000–25,000 BC, and for millennia, only earthenware pottery was made, with stoneware gradually developing some 5,000 years ago, but then apparently disappearing for a few thousand years. Outside East Asia, porcelain was manufactured at any scale only from the 18th century AD, and then initially as an expensive luxury.

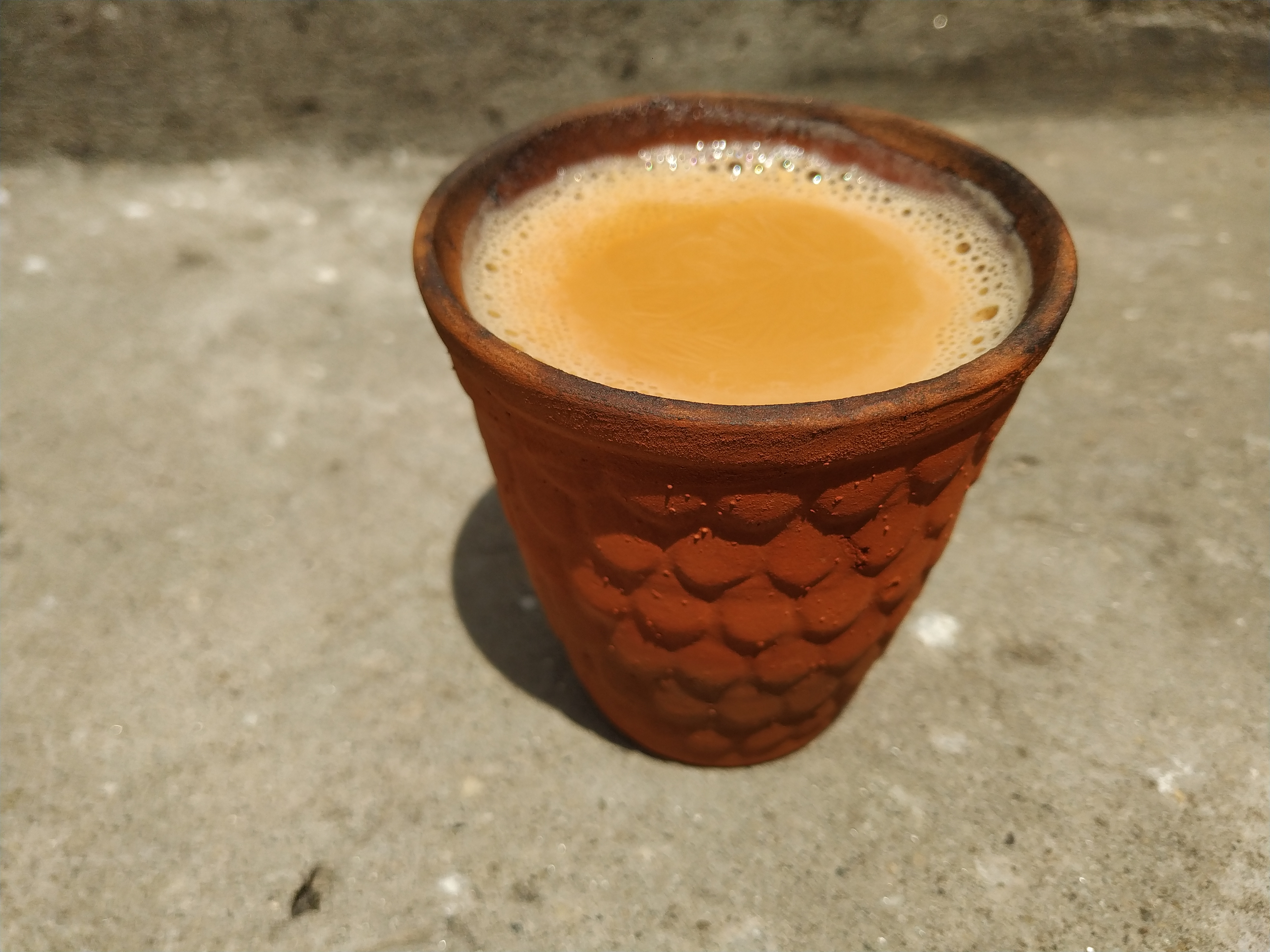
Tea served in a kulhar, which are disposable earthenware teacups in South Asia

After it is fired, earthenware is opaque and non-vitreous, soft and capable of being scratched with a knife. The Combined Nomenclature of the European Union describes it as being made of selected clays sometimes mixed with feldspars and varying amounts of other minerals, and white or light-coloured (i.e., slightly greyish, cream, or ivory).

== Characteristics ==
Generally, unfired earthenware bodies exhibit higher plasticity than most whiteware bodies and hence are easier to shape by RAM press, roller-head or potter's wheel than bone china or porcelain.

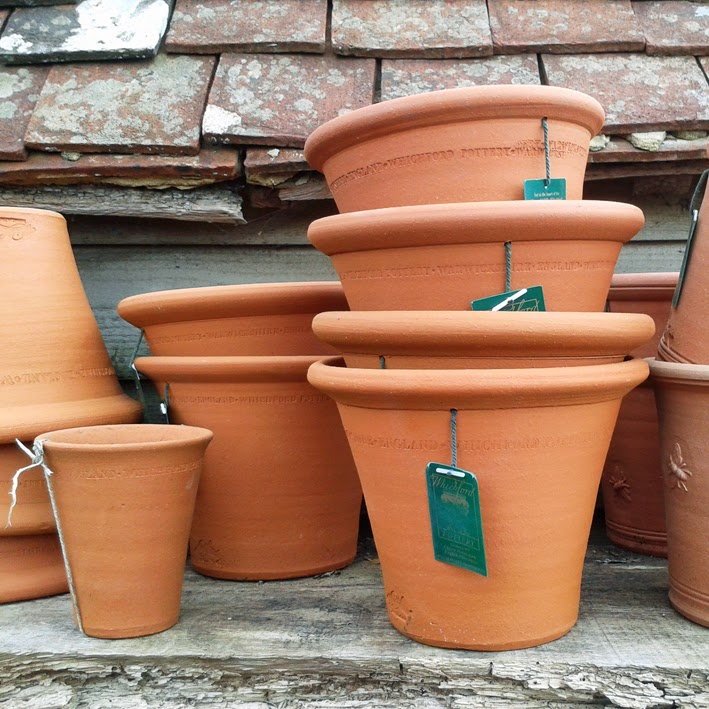
Terracotta flower pots with terracotta tiles in the background

Due to its porosity, fired earthenware, with a water absorption of 5-8%, must be glazed to be watertight. Earthenware has lower mechanical strength than bone china, porcelain or stoneware, and consequently articles are commonly made in thicker cross-section, although they are still more easily chipped.

Darker-coloured terracotta earthenware, typically orange or red due to a comparatively high content of iron oxides, is widely used for flower pots, tiles and some decorative and oven ware.

== Production ==
=== Materials ===
The compositions of earthenware bodies vary considerably, and include both prepared and 'as dug'; the former being by far the dominant type for studio and industry. A general body formulation for contemporary earthenware is 25% kaolin, 25% ball clay, 35% quartz and 15% feldspar.

=== Firing ===
Earthenware can be produced at firing temperatures as low as 600 °C (1,112 °F) and many clays will not fire successfully above about 1,000 °C (1,830 °F). Much historical pottery was fired somewhere around 800 °C (1,470 °F), giving a wide margin of error where there was no precise way of measuring temperature, and very variable conditions within the kiln.

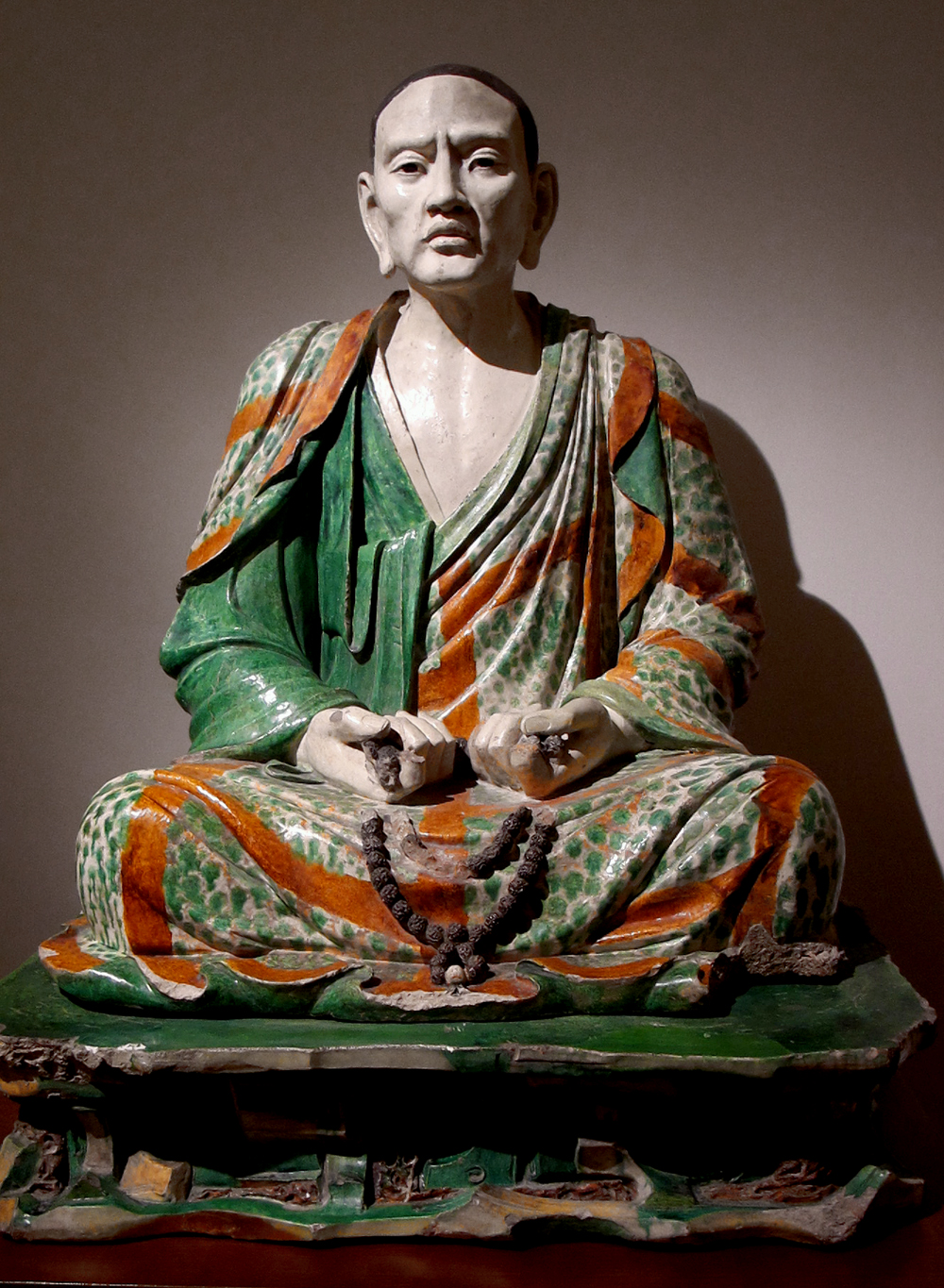
One of the life-size Yixian glazed pottery luohans. China, Liao dynasty (907–1125 CE)

Modern earthenware may be biscuit (or "bisque") fired to temperatures between 1,000 and 1,150 °C (1,830 and 2,100 °F) and glost-fired (or "glaze-fired") to between 950 and 1,050 °C (1,740 and 1,920 °F). Some studio potters follow the reverse practice, with a low-temperature biscuit firing and a high-temperature glost firing. Oxidising atmospheres are the most common.

After firing, most earthenware bodies will be colored white, buff, or red. For iron-rich bodies earthenware, firing at comparatively low temperature in an oxidising atmosphere results in a red colour, whilst higher temperatures with a reducing atmosphere results in darker colours, including black. Higher firing temperatures may cause earthenware to bloat.

== Examples of earthenware ==
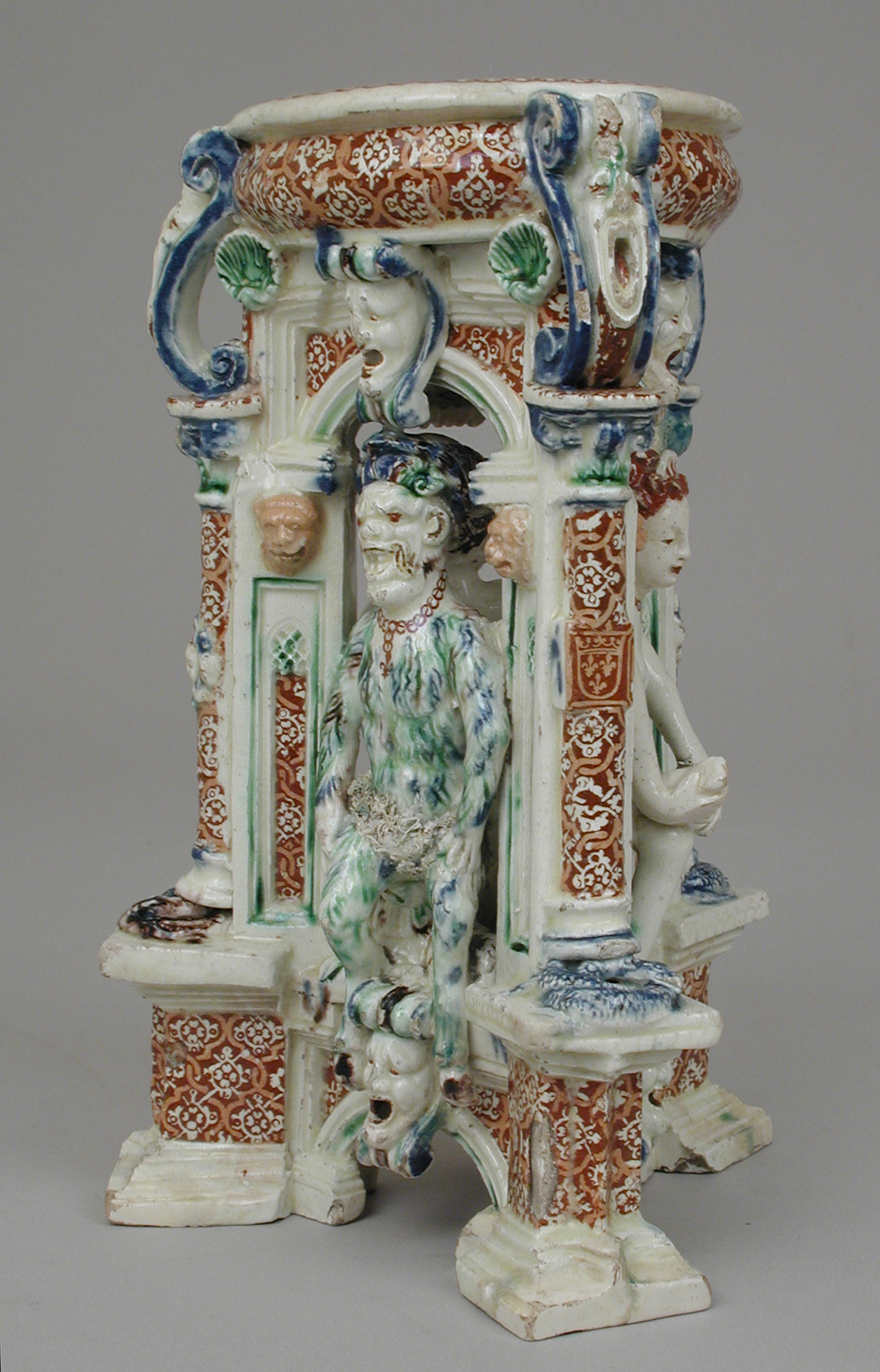
Triangular Saint-Porchaire ware salt. 17.5 cm high.

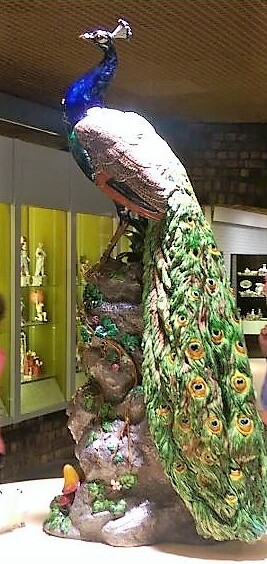
Life-size majolica peacock by Mintons, c. 1876. In 2010, an example sold for £110,000.

Despite the most highly valued types of pottery often switching to stoneware and porcelain as these were developed by a particular culture, there are many artistically important types of earthenware. All ancient Greek and ancient Roman pottery is earthenware, as is the Hispano-Moresque ware of the late Middle Ages, which developed into tin-glazed pottery or faience traditions in several parts of Europe, mostly notably the painted maiolica of the Italian Renaissance, and Dutch Delftware. With a white glaze, these were able to imitate porcelains both from East Asia and Europe.

Amongst the most complicated earthenware ever made are the life-size Yixian glazed pottery luohans of the Liao dynasty (907–1125), Saint-Porchaire ware of the mid-16th century, apparently made for the French court and the life-size majolica peacocks by Mintons in the 1860s.

In the 18th century, especially in English Staffordshire pottery, technical improvements enabled very fine wares such as Wedgwood's creamware, that competed with porcelain with considerable success, as his huge creamware Frog Service for Catherine the Great showed. The invention of transfer printing processes made highly decorated wares cheap enough for far wider sections of the population in Europe.

In China, sancai glazed wares were lead-glazed earthenware, and as elsewhere, terracotta remained important for sculpture. The Etruscans had made large sculptures such as statues in it, where the Romans used it mainly for figurines and Campana reliefs. Chinese painted or Tang dynasty tomb figures were earthenware as were the later Yixian glazed pottery luohans. After the ceramic figurine was revived in European porcelain, earthenware figures followed, such as the popular English Staffordshire figures.

== Sanitaryware ==
During the 19th century, glazed earthenware was the primary material used to transition lavatory facilities from rudimentary outdoor privies to indoor flush toilets. These early "wash-out" and "long-hopper" closets were crafted from a thick, porous ceramic body that required a heavy feldspathic or salt glaze to remain impermeable and functional. To ensure the durability of these fixtures, manufacturers often utilized a "cane and white" finish, where the exterior remained a natural buff colour while the interior received a hygienic, white glaze.

Manufacturers such as Twyford and Doulton refined these designs, often decorating the bowls with intricate blue-and-white transfer prints to make them appear more like fine furniture than industrial plumbing. This aesthetic approach helped overcome the Victorian era's social taboos regarding indoor sanitation.

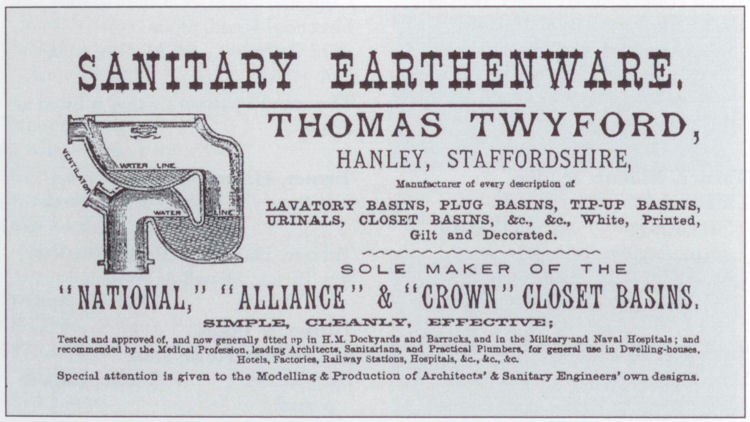
Advertisement from 1884 for an earthenware toilet

However, earthenware exhibited significant technical weaknesses for this application: the body was easily chipped, the glaze would craze over time and the underlying porous ceramic would absorb moisture and odours. This inherent lack of hygienic characteristics spurred the late-century shift towards fireclay ceramic and vitreous china, which has higher densities and are fully vitrified as required for modern sanitary standards.

== See also ==
Other types of earthenware or other examples include:

- Terracotta
- Redware
- Victorian majolica
- Lusterware, which uses iridescent glazes
- Raku
- Ironstone china, on the border of earthenware and stoneware
- Yellowware
- List of classifications of pottery
