= Palissy =

English pottery brand

Palissy Pottery Ltd
- Type: Private company
- Predecessor: A.E. Jones (Longton) Ltd
- Founded: 1946
- Defunct: 1988
- Fate: Following mergers and buy-outs, ceased to exist
- Headquarters: Stoke-on-Trent, England

Palissy was the trade name under which the English firm of A. E. Jones and Sons, of Stoke-on-Trent, marketed their china and pottery. The name was chosen as a tribute to Bernard Palissy, the famous French potter of the 16th century, creator of Palissy ware.

== History ==
They were bought out in 1958 by the Royal Worcester group, and in turn the Carborundum company that already owned Spode china and took over Hammersley china in 1972, and then Royal Worcester in 1974. Later pieces are marked Royal Worcester Group, then Royal Worcester Spode Group, but production was undoubtedly still in Longton. From 1982, production of Palissy and Hammersley ranges was merged, until their final demise in 1988.

== Pottery ==
Earlier marks were the word Palissy within a sort of shield or tureen shaped outline, which the few published sources seem to think stopped before 1940, but was clearly used as late as 1950, then about 1935 to 1939 some items have a palette outline shape with Palissy Hand painted. Plus some use of the two words Palissy Ware, sometimes in an art-deco squared format. Postwar usage was also the two words Palissy England, with England written along the horizontal tail of the letter y and pottery with the word Palissy impressed. Plus, perhaps to dupe postwar American export customers, a mark of Palissy Established 1853, around the design of a whiskered head and shoulders presumably trying to allude to Bernard Palissy. Many of the same pattern transfers were used, but Palissy ware is somewhat cream and quite distinctive against the whiter body of Hammersley, in the same physical shapes.
