= Saint-Porchaire ware =

16th-century French pottery

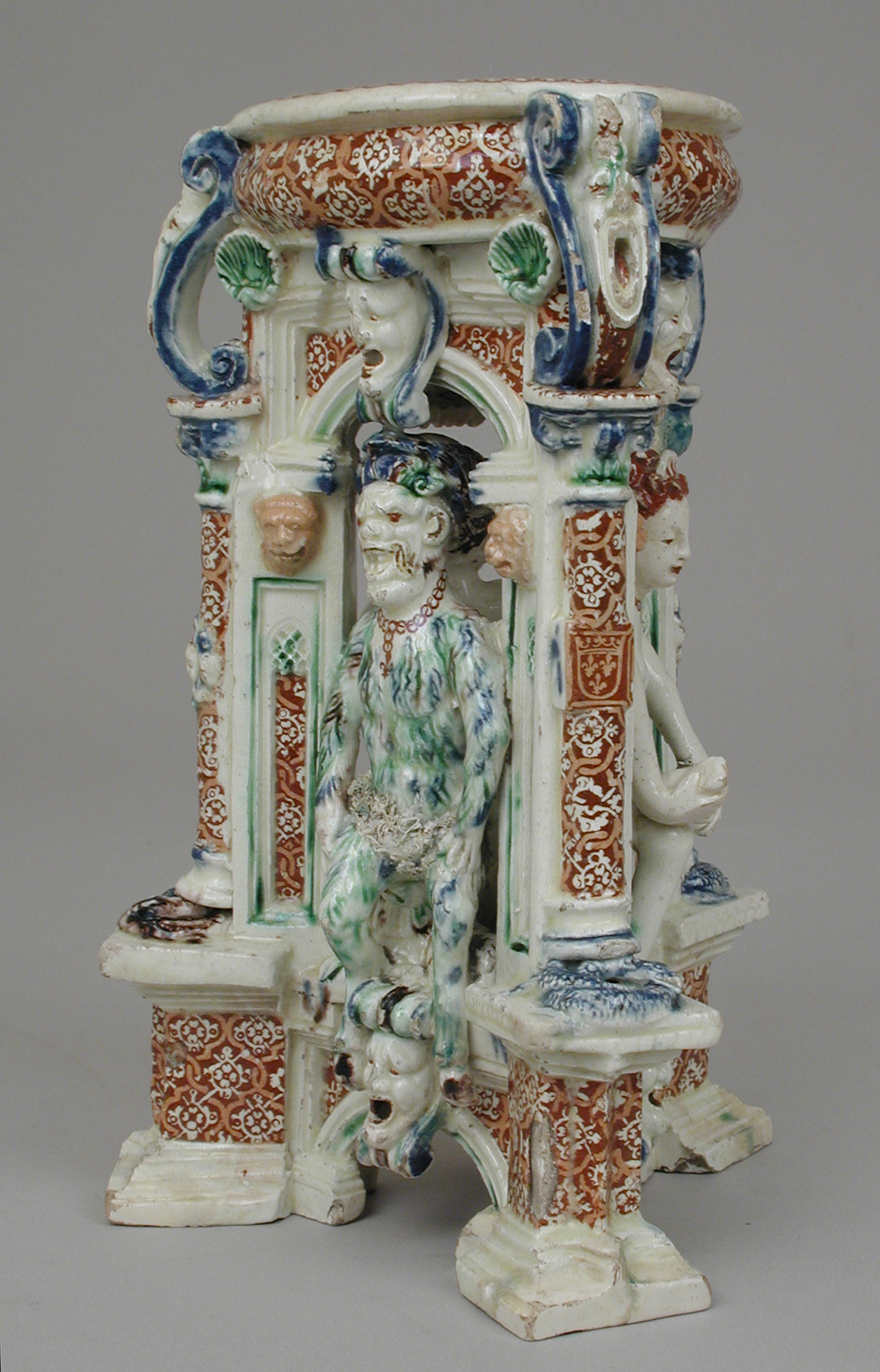
Triangular salt, Metropolitan, 6 7/8 in. (17.5 cm) high, with a (?) satyr, and (?) Venus at right.

Saint-Porchaire ware is the earliest French pottery of very high quality. It is white lead-glazed earthenware, often conflated with true faience, that was made for a restricted French clientele from perhaps the 1520s to the 1550s. Only about seventy pieces of this ware survive, all of them well known before World War II. None have turned up in the last half-century. It is characterized by the use of inlays of clay in a different coloured clay, and, as Victorian revivalists found, is extremely difficult to make.

The main body is white, though covered by a thin cream glaze. There is intensive use of patterns inlaid in brown, reddish-brown or yellow-ochre slips. The overall form of most pieces was made in several parts, with many smaller sculpted forms shaped separately and added on. These and other elements may be given a thin wash in blue, green, brown or yellow before glazing.

When collectors first noticed this ware in the nineteenth century, the tradition of where it had been made had been lost, and it was only known as Henri II ware, or Henri Deux ware, for some pieces bore the king's monogram. In fact the reign of Henri II of France lasted only from 1547 until his death in 1559, so most of the period generally assigned to the wares was during the reign of his father Francis I of France, which began in 1515. Its style clearly showed the influence of the Fontainebleau School of Mannerist decor, which introduced the Italian Renaissance to France.

Predating Palissy ware, and Italian Medici porcelain by some decades, it might be called the first high-quality European ceramic style to show an interest in sculptural forms, rather than the decoration in paint of flattish dish surfaces typical in Hispano-Moresque ware and Italian Renaissance maiolica.

== Saint-Porchaire? ==
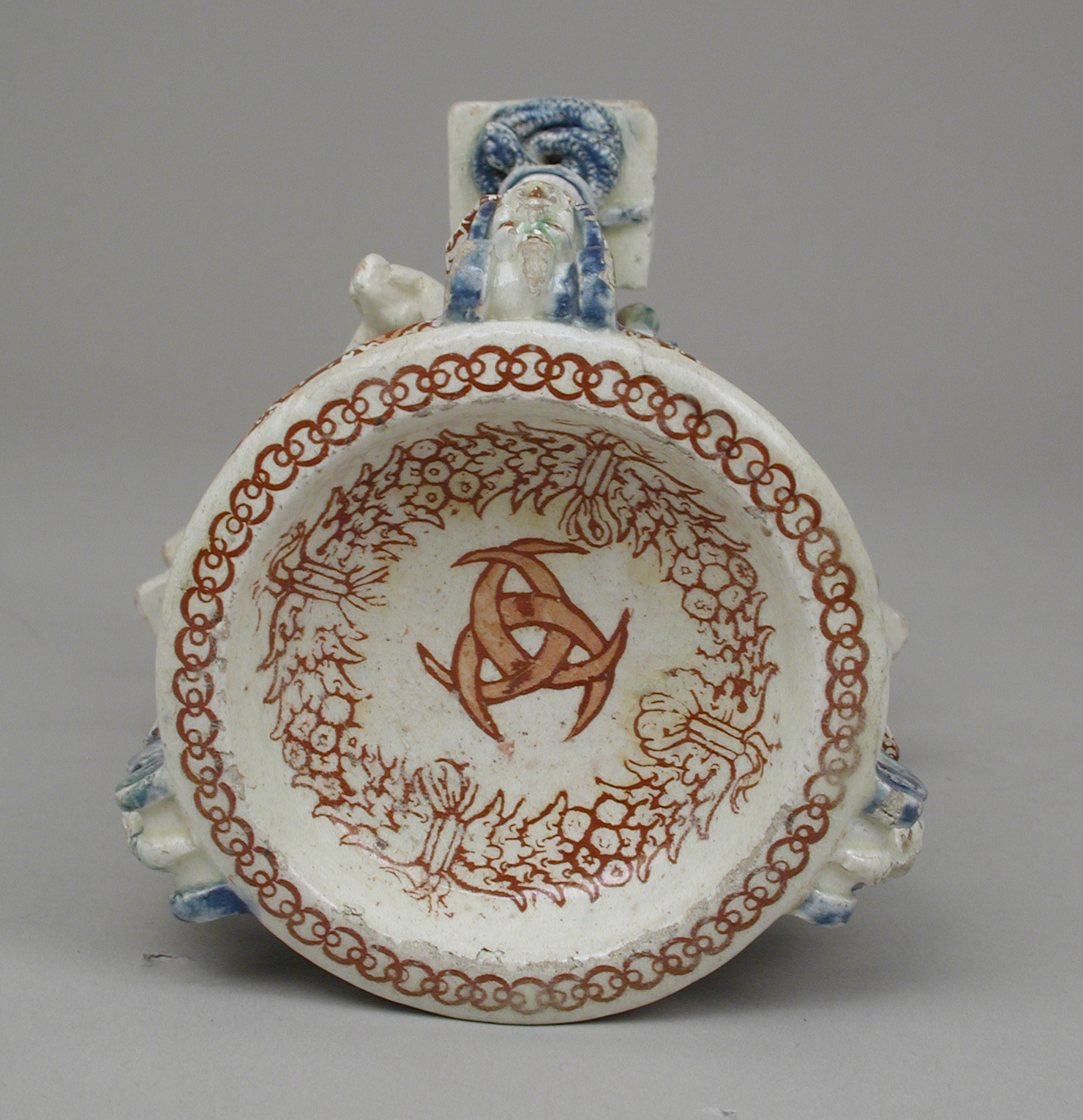
The bowl of the same salt from above, Metropolitan. The device of three interlocked crescents was used by Henri II and his mistress Diane de Poitiers.

In 1898 Edmond Bonaffé linked its source for the first time to the village of Saint-Porchaire (nowadays a part of Bressuire, Poitou). He noted that in 1552 Charles Estienne had spoken of the beauty of the Saint-Porchaire ware, and that in 1566 a local poet had praised it in a poem and cited 16th-century inventories that included objects of terre de Saint-Porchaire or made façon de Saint-Porchaire.

The attribution to this small village raises as many questions as it answers, and despite considerable evidence of many types supporting it, many scholars still favour a closer connection to (usually) Paris. There is no archaeological evidence at Saint-Porchaire to support the village as the kiln site, and the sophisticated range of design sources, both engravings and actual examples of metalwork seems beyond the cultural horizon of a place far from Fontainebleau and Paris. The clay of the area, rich in kaolin, is very suitable for fine pottery, however, and in particular shrinks much less than most when drying. The local magnates and patrons of the pottery, the Montmorency-Laval family, part of the powerful House of Laval, may provide a route between the rural pottery and sophisticated court taste. The court architect Philibert de l'Orme is often brought in to discussions of the ware, but there is no evidence for this. Contemporary parallels for the ornament used have been drawn with metalwork, bookbinding stamps, and ornament prints.

Many armorials on Saint-Porchaire wares show that its clients were from the nobility, and religious institutions, in addition to wares that bear the royal arms of Henri II, and in at least one case, Francis I. The device of three interlocked crescents seen on several pieces was used by Henri and his mistress Diane de Poitiers.

== Wares ==
The production of Saint-Porchaire ware was labour-intensive, and in overall decorative design, no two pieces are alike. The basic clay shapes were thrown on the wheel and perhaps refined on the lathe or were assembled from shaped slabs of clay; the candlesticks, for example, were assembled from more than a hundred separate components. Mould-formed sculptural decoration was applied with slip to make relief masks, festoons, and the like. Additionally, hand-modelled figures might serve as handles for ewers. Banding and fields of fine geometrical decoration or rinceaux were made by repeatedly impressing metal dies into the leather-hard body, or to thin strips of clay that were then stuck on. After further drying the impressions were filled with dark brown, rust red or ochre yellow clay slip that was rubbed off the surface to give an inlay with a discreet range of colors. Further touches of colored slip, such as a spinach green, were applied.

It was only realized in the 1950s that many of the zones of repeated small patterns were added to the body as a thin skin already carrying the pattern. It has been suggested that actual bookbinding stamps, in metal for decorating leather bindings, were used on the clay to create the spaces to be filled in with coloured clay; on the other hand the Louvre has two stamps made of fired clay or plaster. The exact technique for making the extremely small and delicate inlaid patterns remains somewhat of a puzzle for scholars.

The surface was then covered with a lead glaze that fired to give a slightly golden transparency. Salt cellars, standing cups with covers, plateaux, ewers and the spouted vessels called biberons, and candlesticks, often in distinctive bizarre and fantastic designs derived from Mannerist silver- and goldsmiths' work, are the usual forms of Saint-Porchaire wares.

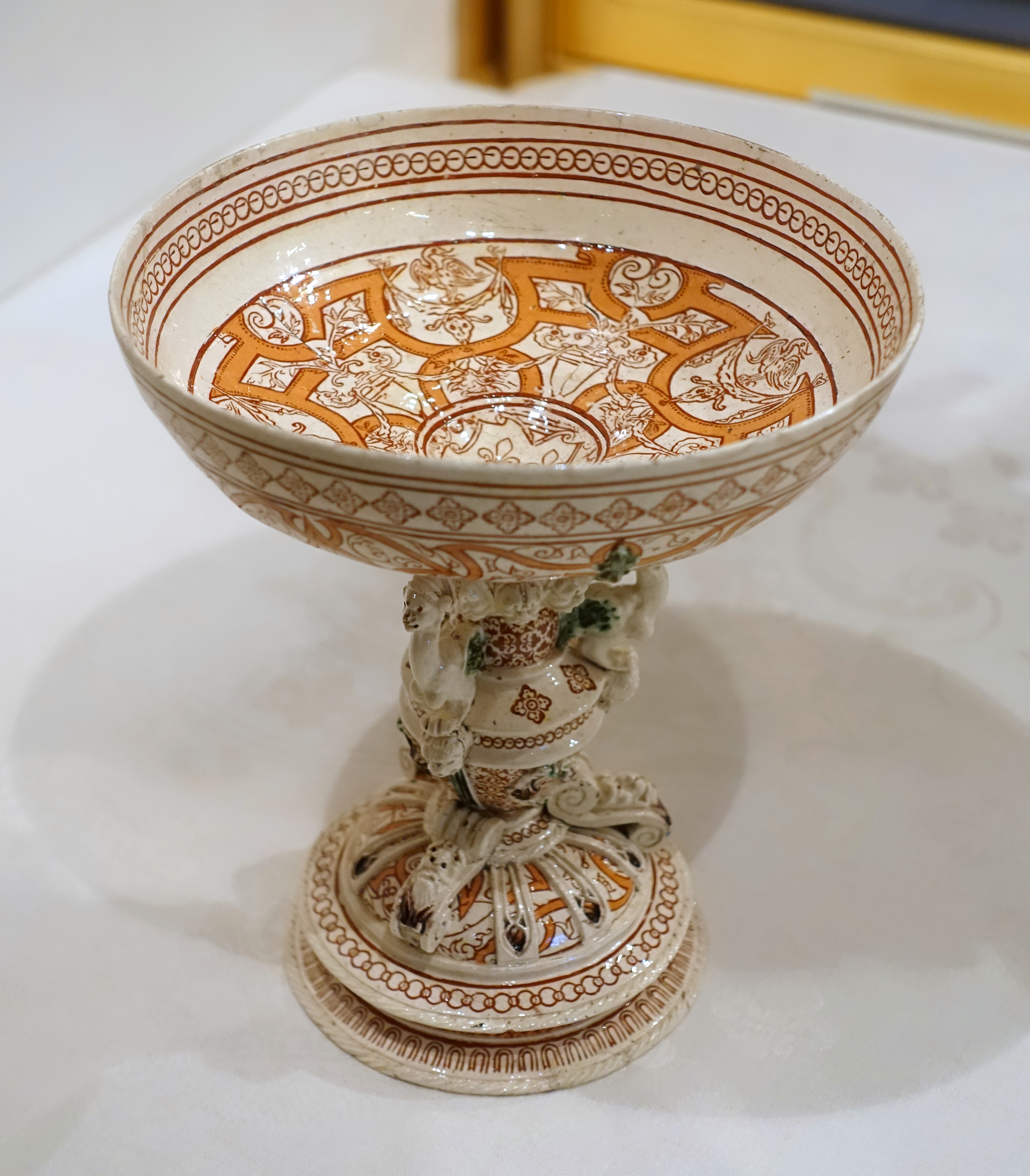
Cup, Waddesdon Manor

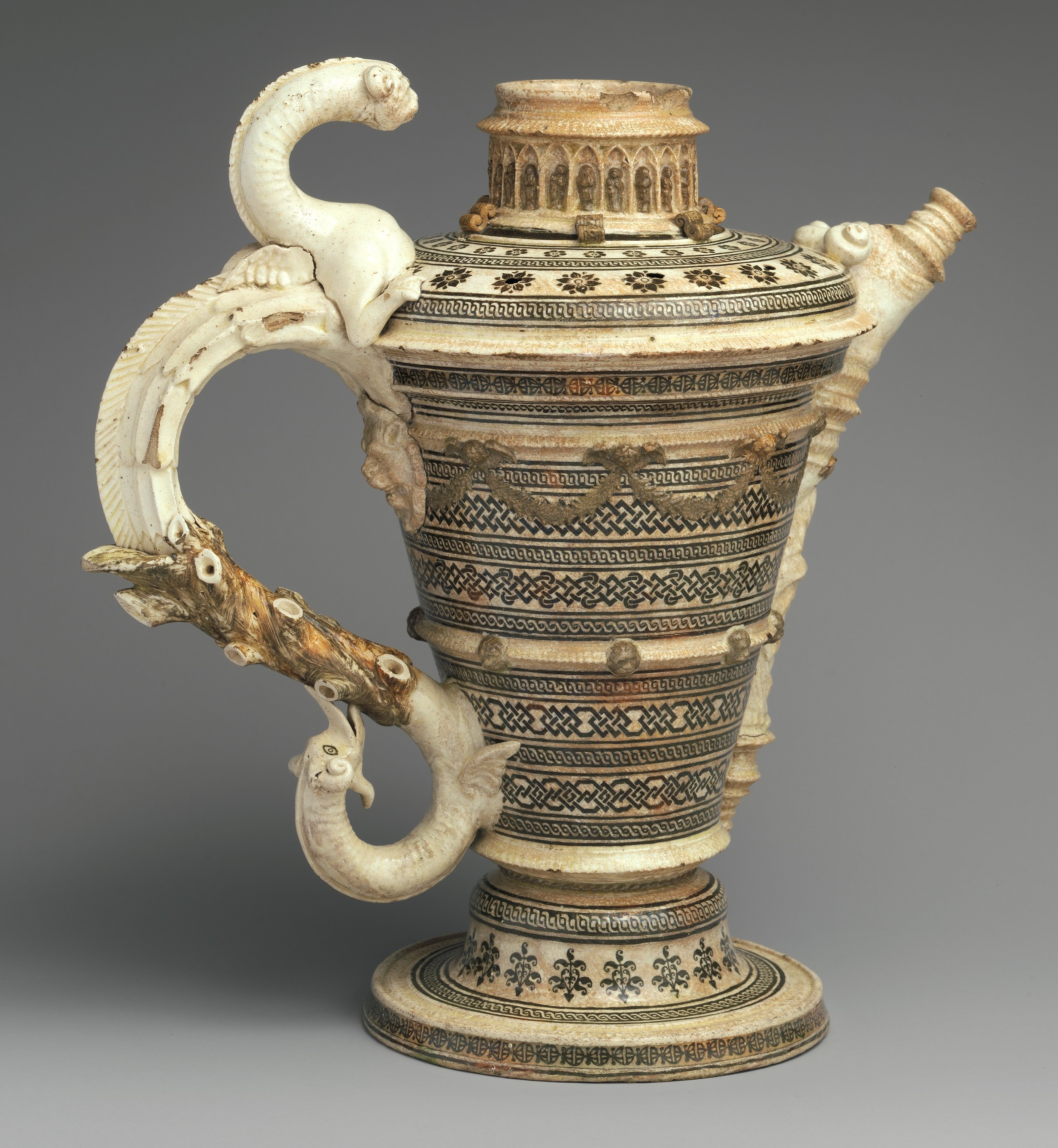
Ewer, Metropolitan

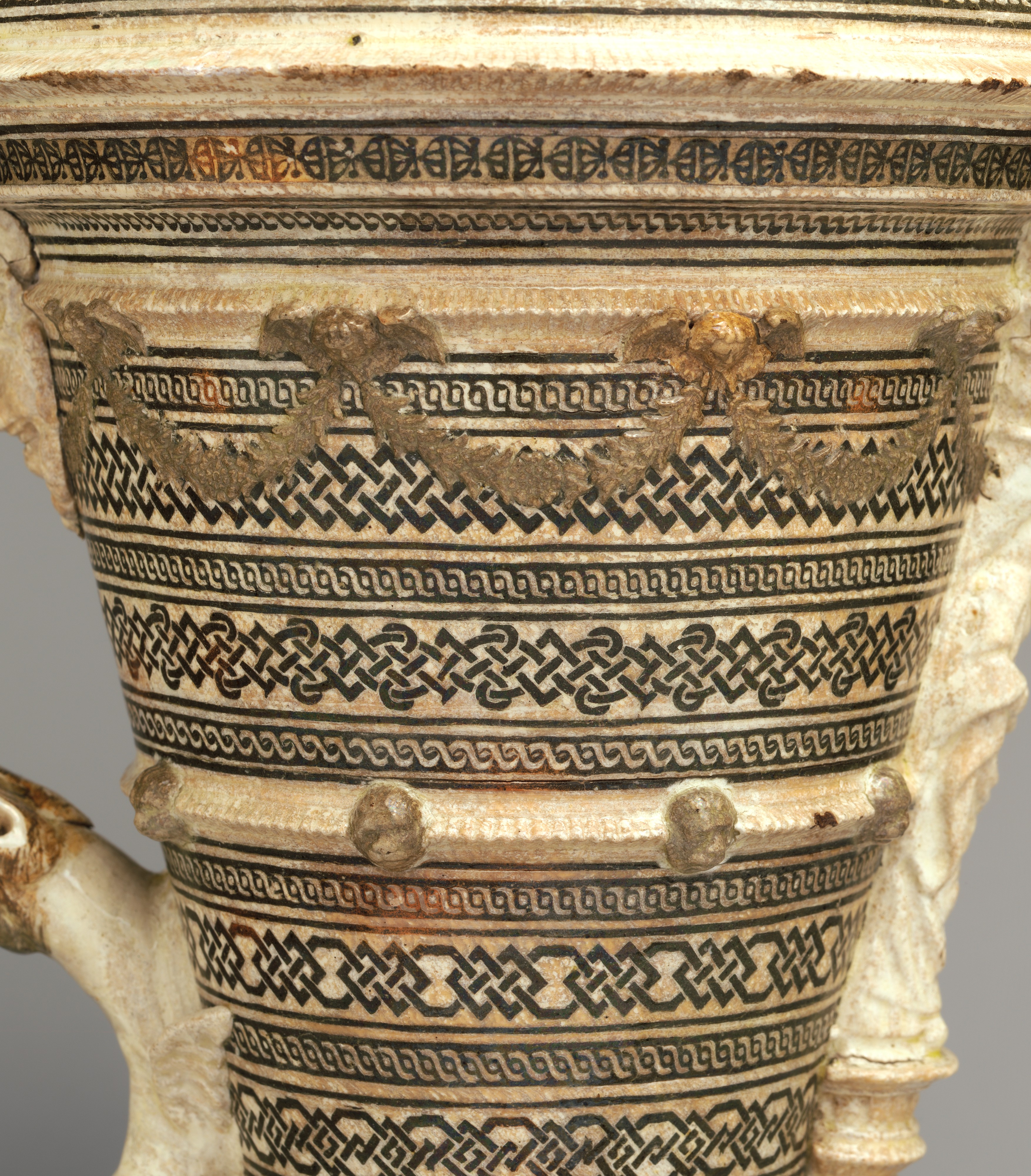
Detail of ewer, Metropolitan

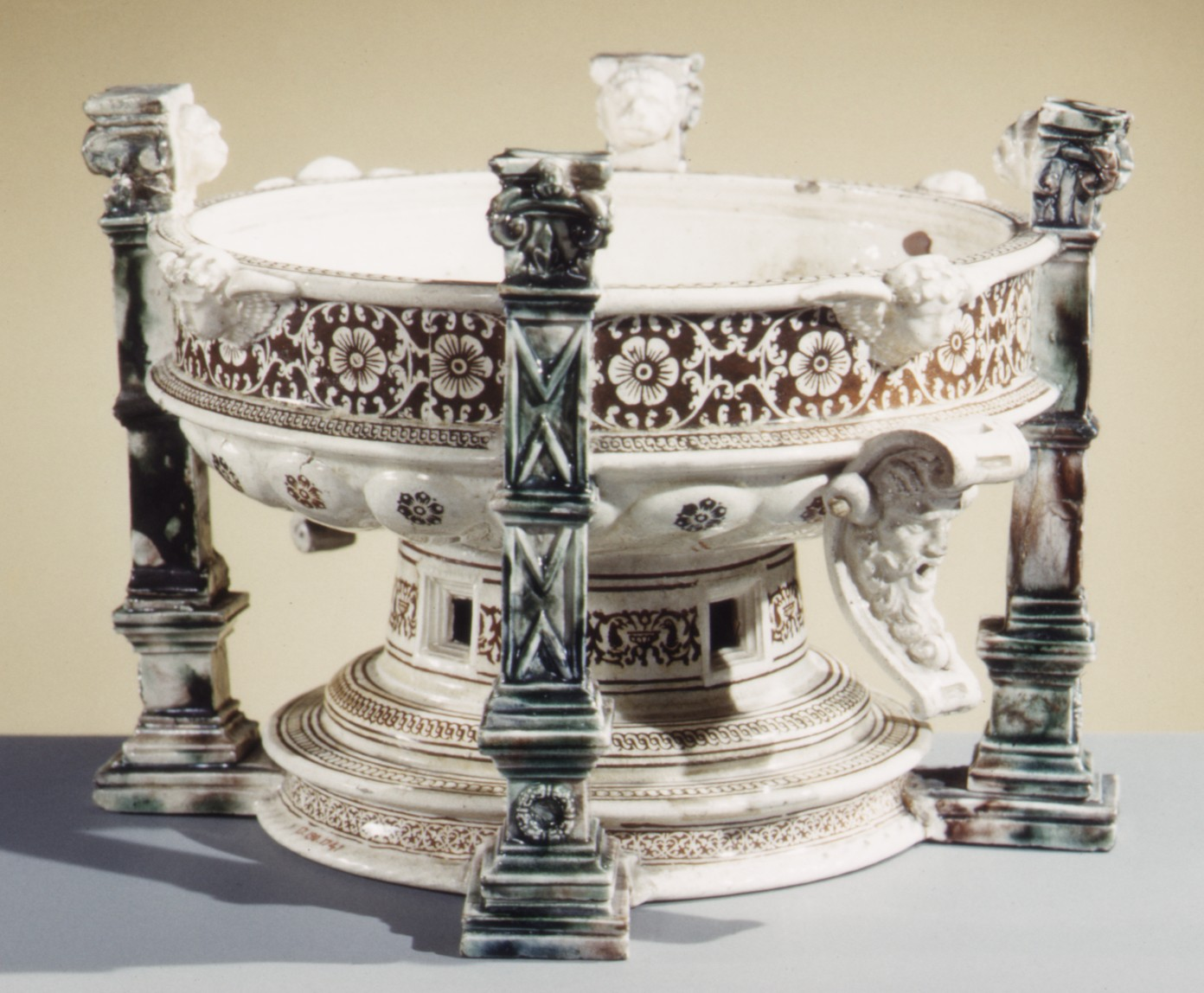
Basin, Metropolitan

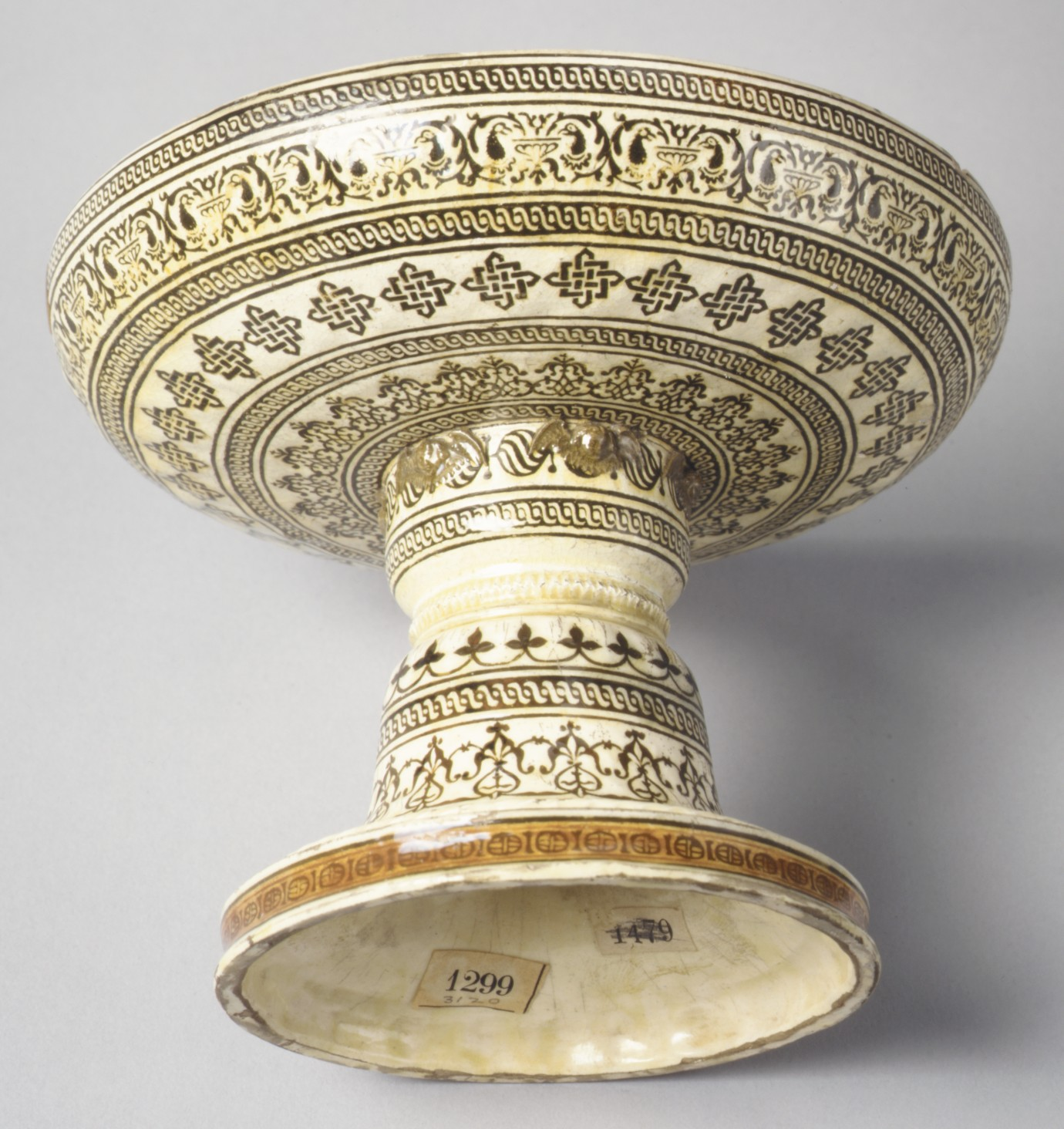
Tazza, cover not shown, Metropolitan

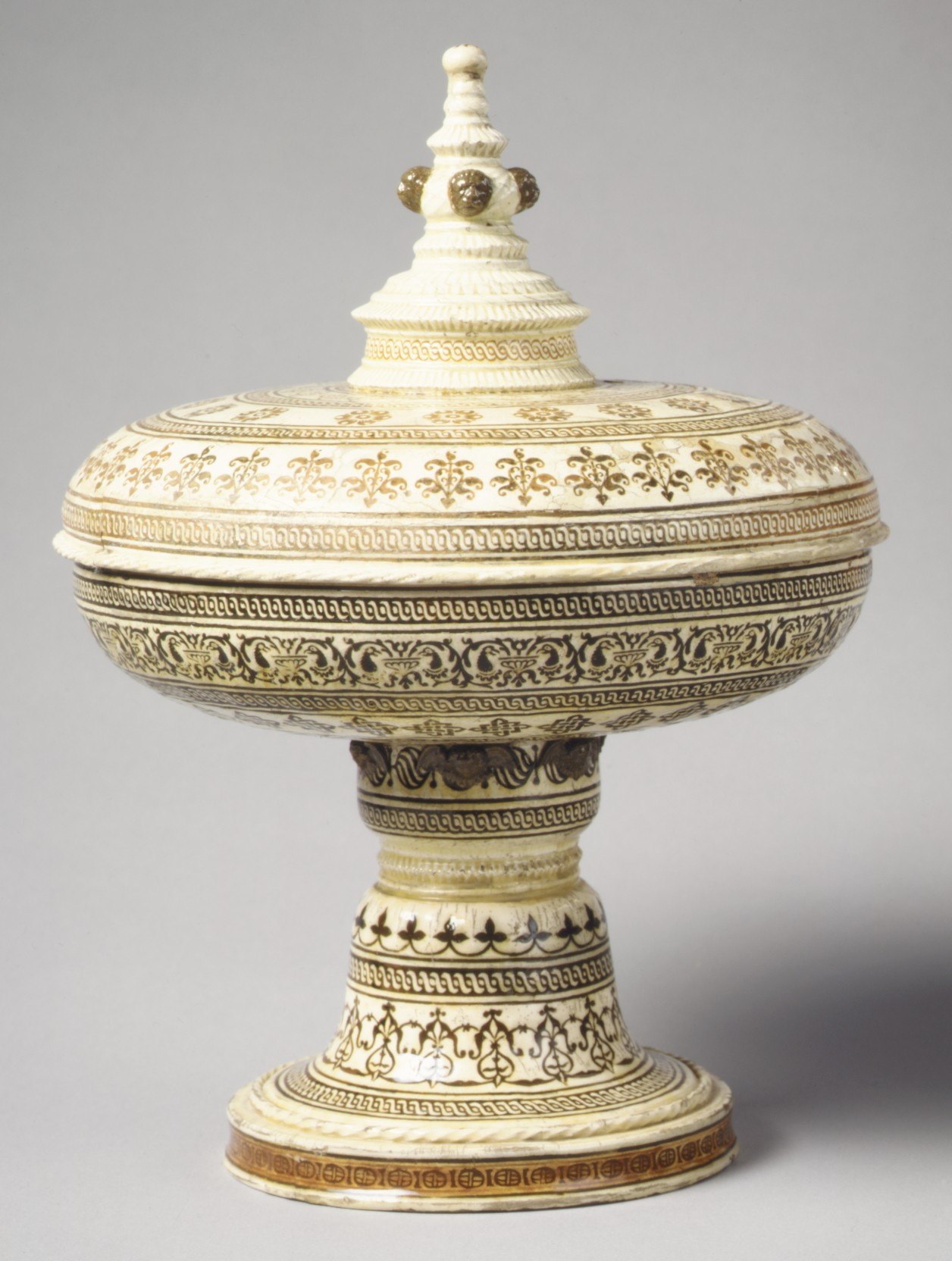
Same tazza with cover

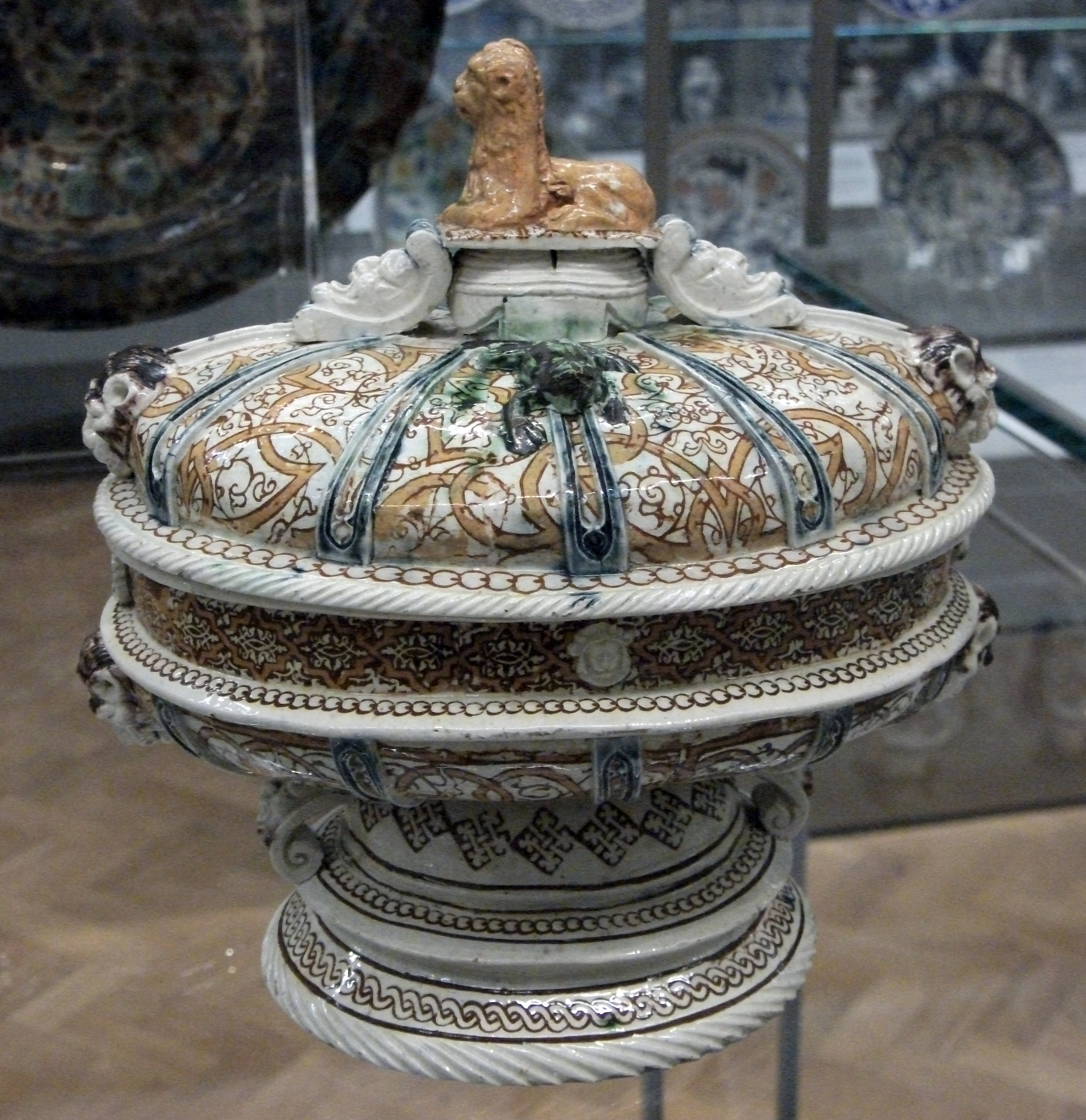
Footed bowl and cover, 1550–75, Victoria & Albert Museum

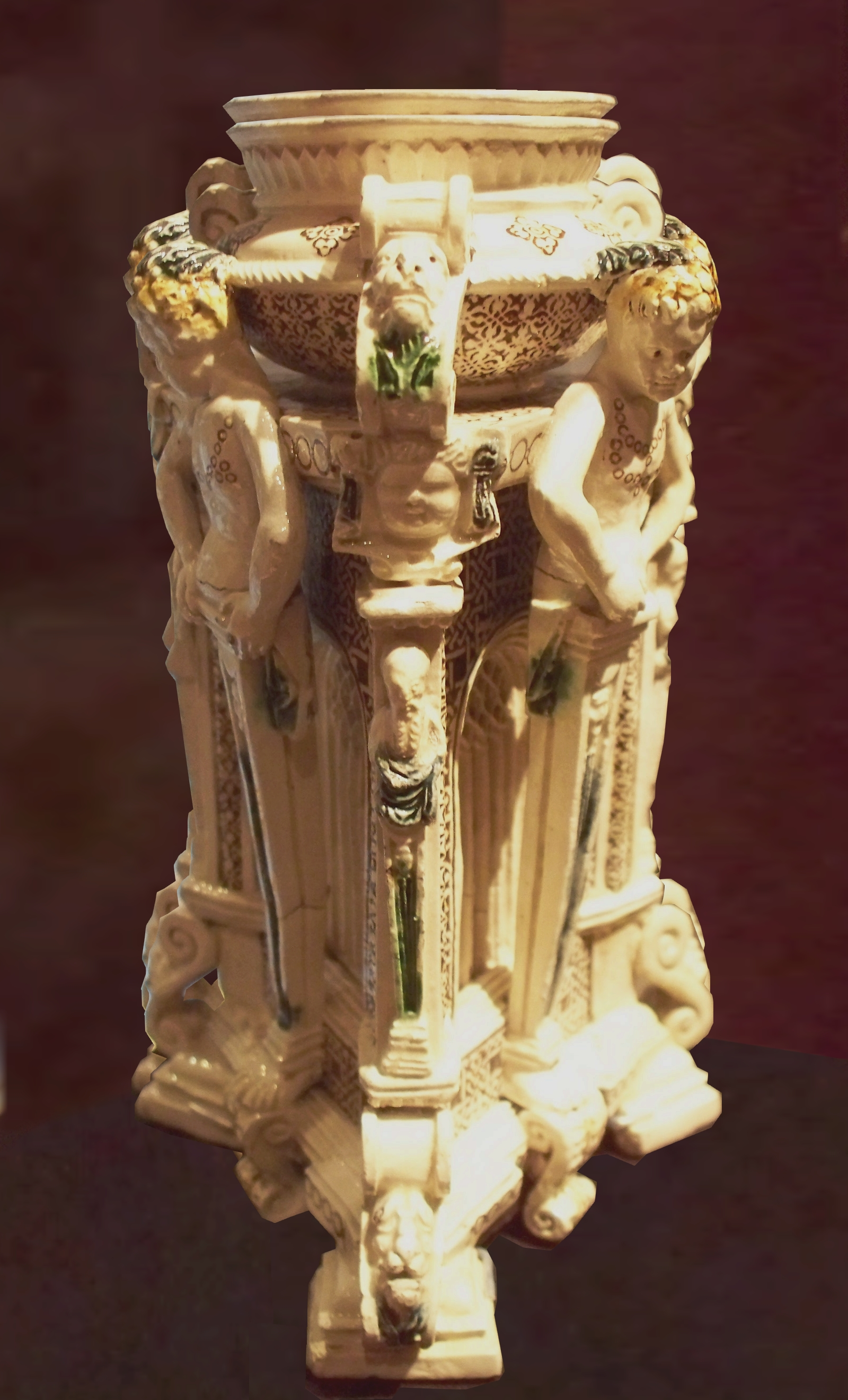
Saint-Porchaire Standing Saltcellar, ca. 1555, just over six inches tall. Taft Museum of Art

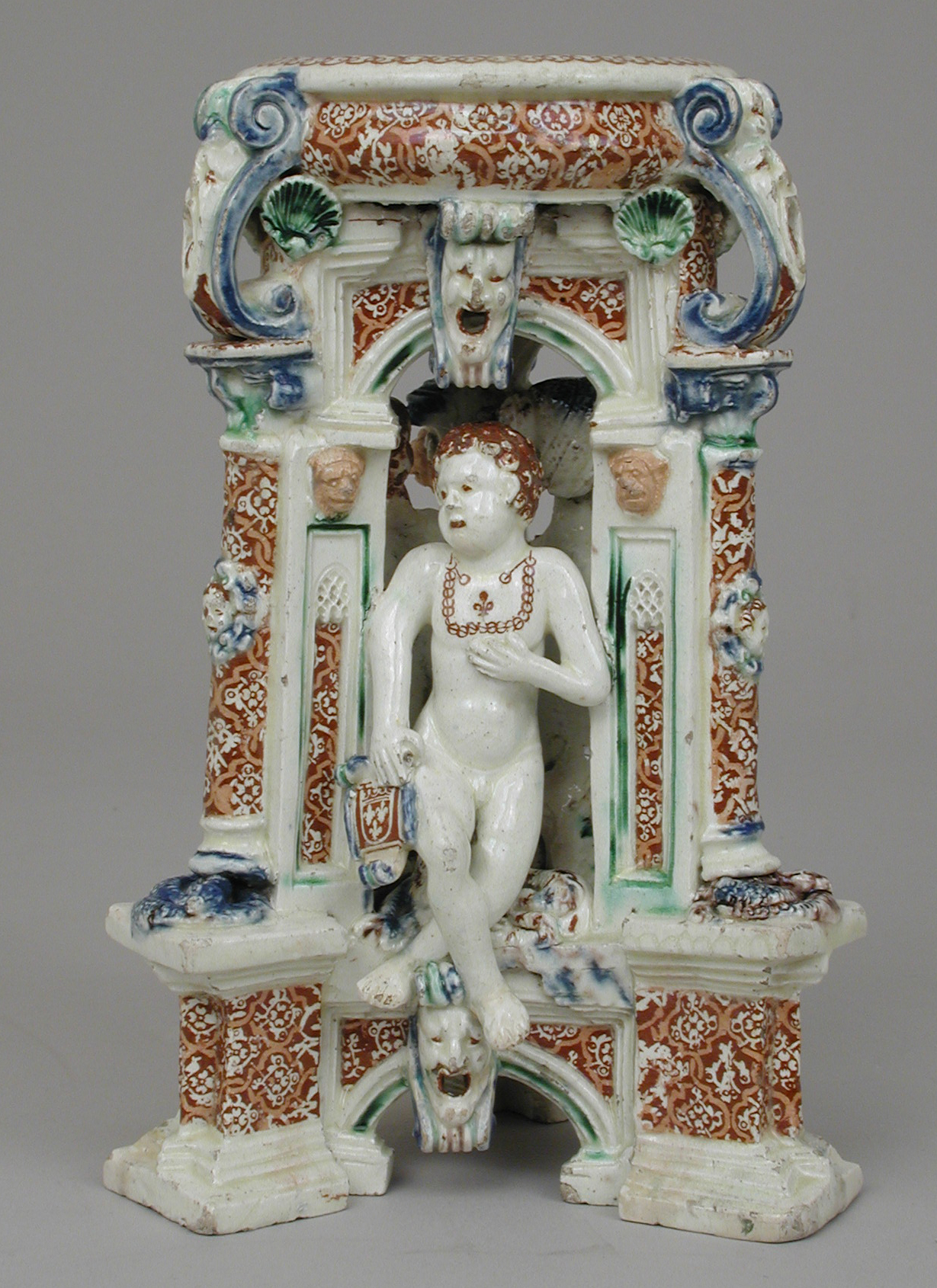
Putto bearing the arms of France, another view of salt, Metropolitan

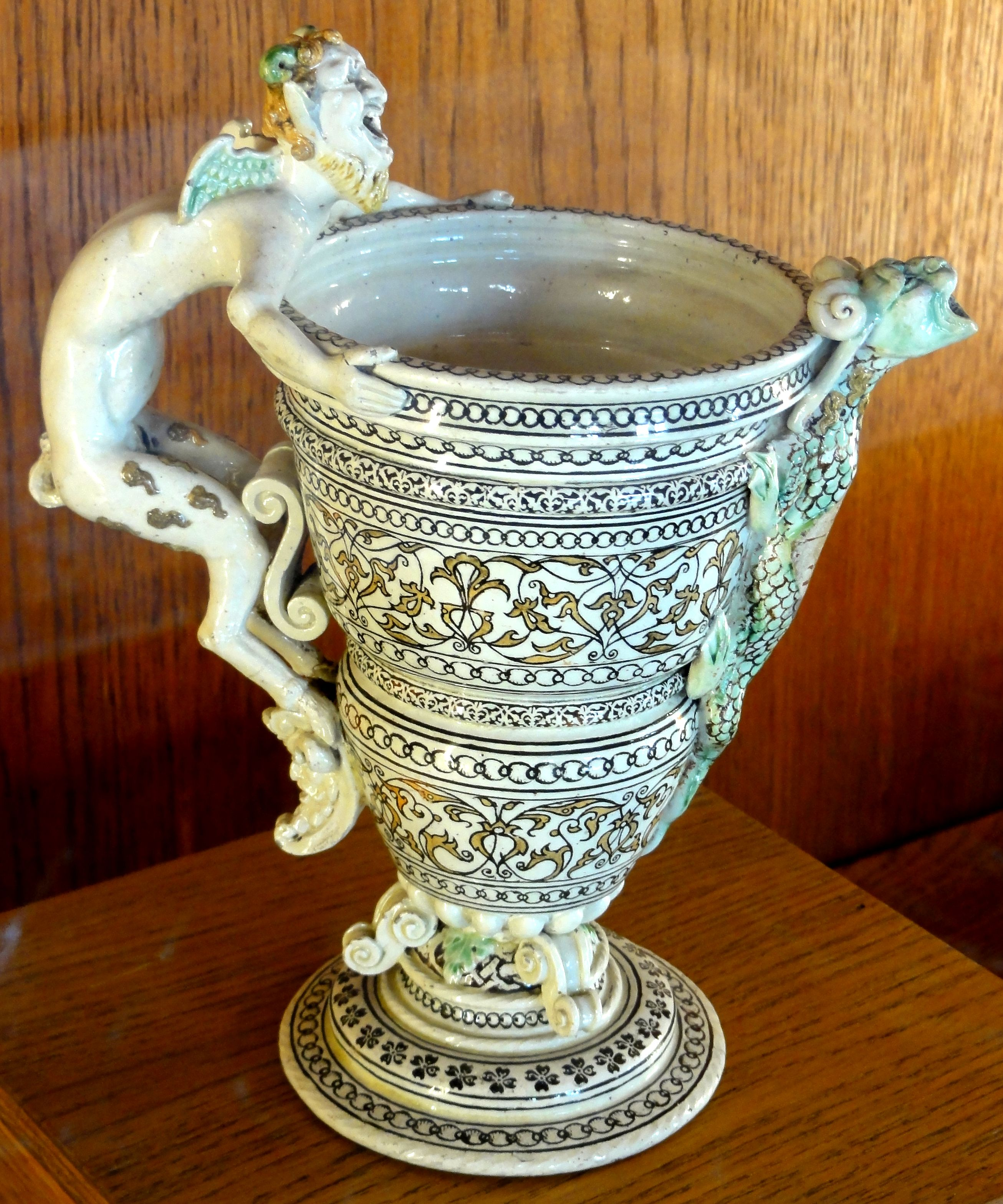
Jug, Musée national de la Renaissance, before 1558

== Palissy ==
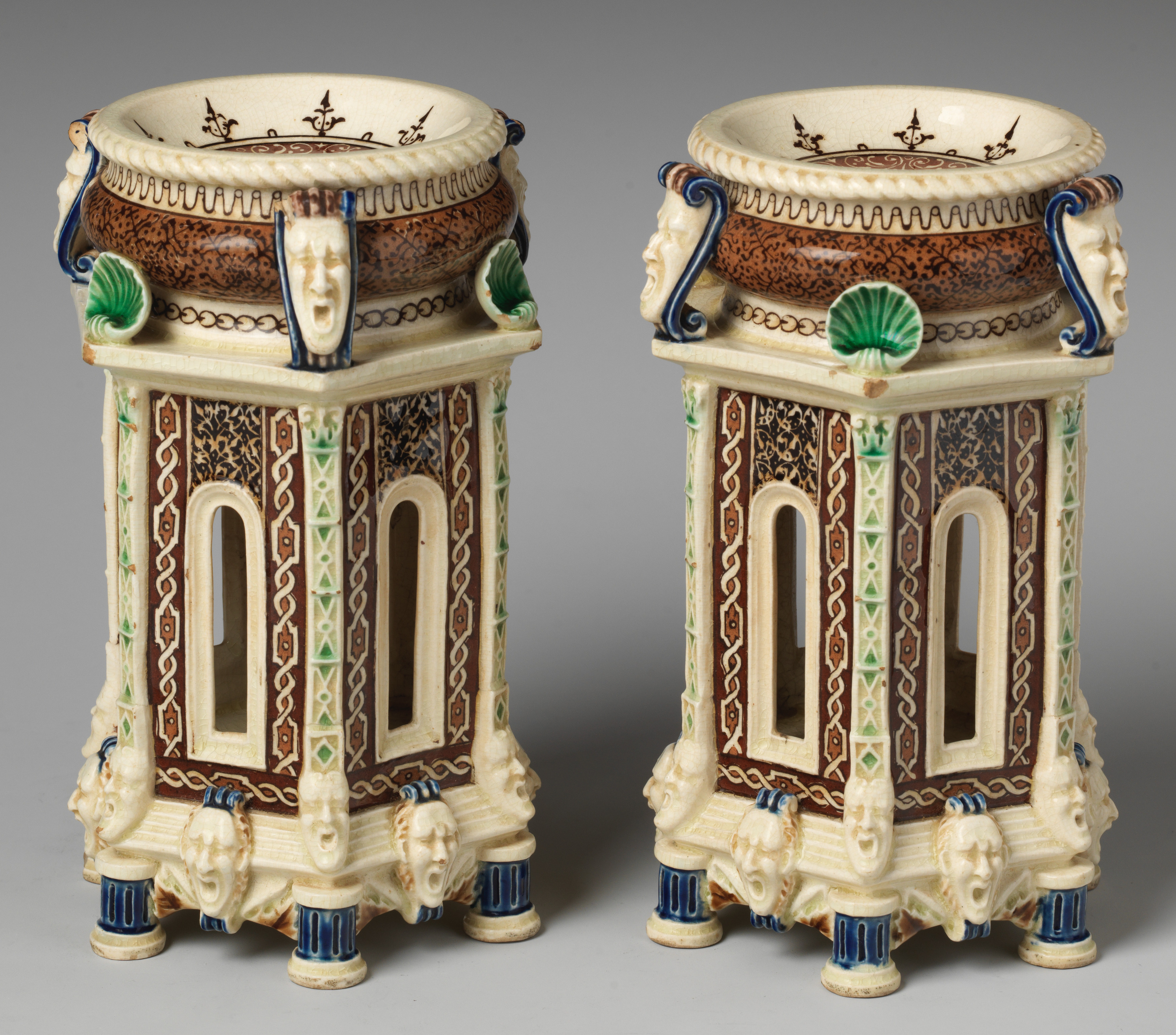
Pair of Mintons salts, signed by Charles Toft, 1870s, Metropolitan.

Recent findings in advance of an exhibition in 1997, "Bernard Palissy et la céramique de Saint-Porchaire" at Château d'Écouen, suggest Bernard Palissy may have employed some Saint-Porchaire techniques at his Paris workshop, 1565–72, or been more closely involved. The Victoria & Albert Museum rather boldly attributes a Saint-Porchaire candlestick it dates to "ca. 1547-1559" to Palissy. Other than that, the experiment at Saint-Porchaire remained without precedents and without direct influence in the development of French ceramics, which, apart from Palissy's experiments, started anew with increasingly fine faience in the later seventeenth century.

== Collections ==
The ware had great appeal to wealthy 19th-century collectors. Supposedly at one time various members of the Rothschild family had 15 pieces between them, and J. Pierpont Morgan had eight pieces.

The great majority of the sixty-odd known pieces are now in museums. Museum collections with three or more pieces include, in the Paris area: Louvre, Musée du Petit Palais, National Ceramic Museum at Sèvres; Victoria and Albert Museum in London; in New York the Metropolitan Museum of Art (7) and Morgan Library and Museum (sharing the J. Pierpont Morgan pieces); National Gallery of Art, Washington DC (3), Cleveland Museum of Art, & Hermitage Museum.

== Revival ==
In 1849 Mintons, a leading factory making Staffordshire pottery, hired Léon Arnoux, a young French ceramic artist, as artistic director; he stayed until 1892. Arnoux had an interest in reviving Saint-Porchaire ware, then generally known as "Henri II ware", and mastered the technique and then taught Charles Toft, perhaps Mintons' top modeller, who produced a small number of "superlatively elegant" pieces. Toft also produced some pieces when he subsequently worked at Wedgwood. Various other 19th-century makers, mostly in France, produced pieces, some perhaps qualifying as fakes, although Mintons' and others are clearly marked.
