= List of classifications of pottery =

Pottery can be categorized/classified in various ways depending on its material, method of production, function, and style.

== Based on firing temperature and material ==
- Earthenware: Fired at a lower temperature (typically below 1,200°C or 2,192°F), earthenware is porous and usually needs to be glazed to hold liquids. It's one of the oldest types of pottery. Bisque, and Raku are examples of earthenware pottery.
- Stoneware: Fired at a higher temperature (typically between 1,200°C and 1,300°C or 2,192°F and 2,372°F), stoneware is non-porous and more durable than earthenware. It is often used for functional items like mugs and plates.
- Porcelain: Fired at the highest temperatures (above 1,300°C or 2,372°F), porcelain is made from fine clay (kaolin) and is known for its white, translucent quality. It is highly durable and often used for fine tableware and decorative objects.

== Functional pottery ==
- Tile/Flooring pottery: Durable pieces used for building or decorating surfaces, such as wall tiles and floor tiles.
- Tableware: Includes dishes, bowls, cups, plates, and other items used for serving and eating food.
- Storage vessels: Such as jars, urns, and amphorae, used for storing liquids, grains, and other materials.
- Cookware: Includes pots, casseroles, and other vessels designed to withstand direct heat.
- Ceremonial pottery: Items used in rituals or ceremonies, including altars, ceremonial bowls, and religious figures.
- Decorative pottery: Includes vases, sculptures, and other objects made primarily for aesthetic purposes.
- Planters or Garden Pots: Containers used for growing plants, often featuring drainage holes.

== Based on production techniques ==
- Hand-built pottery: Made by hand using methods like coiling, pinching, or slab construction. This method is ancient and often used for larger or uniquely shaped pieces.
- Wheel-thrown pottery: Made on a potter's wheel, allowing for more symmetrical shapes and finer detail. This technique is commonly used for creating bowls, cups, and plates.
- Slip-cast pottery: Made by pouring liquid clay (slip) into molds. This method allows for mass production of pottery with intricate designs.

== Based on decorative techniques ==
- Glazed pottery: Coated with a glaze that becomes glass-like when fired, giving the pottery a smooth, often colorful finish.
- Unglazed pottery: Pottery that is left unglazed, often showcasing the natural color and texture of the clay.
- Overglaze pottery: Decoration applied on top of a glaze, often after the initial firing. This can include painting, gilding, or applying decals.
- Slipware (slip-decorated pottery): Decorated with slip (liquid clay) applied before firing. Slip can be used for painting, dipping, or inlaying designs.
- Sgraffito: A decorative technique where a layer of slip is applied to the pottery, and then patterns are scratched through the slip to reveal the clay beneath.
- Mishima: A technique involving inlaying colored slips into incised designs on the pottery surface.
- Burnished pottery: A method where the surface of the clay is polished to create a shiny finish.
- Resist Techniques: A technique where a material is applied to areas of the pottery to resist glaze or slip, creating patterns once the piece is fired.
- Engraving or Carving: The surface of the pottery is carved or engraved to create patterns or images.

== Cultural and historical pottery ==
- Greek pottery: Famous for its black-figure and red-figure styles, depicting mythological and everyday scenes.
- Chinese pottery: Known for its delicate quality and often intricate blue and white designs.
- Indian pottery: Known for its ancient and diverse styles, mostly being earthenware often featuring intricate designs and vibrant colors.
- Native American pottery: Often hand-built and decorated with symbolic designs, reflecting the cultural heritage of different tribes.
- Pottery of Metepec
- Japanese pottery: (e.g., Raku, Satsuma, and Arita) Renowned for its emphasis on natural forms, textures, and the philosophy of wabi-sabi (finding beauty in imperfection).
- Roman pottery: Known for its functional and decorative wares, Roman pottery includes a variety of styles such as terra sigillata, characterized by its red slip and glossy finish.
- Korean pottery: Renowned for its unique techniques and aesthetics, Korean pottery includes styles such as celadon, known for its jade-green glaze and intricate inlay designs, and buncheong, which features a more textured appearance.
- Persian pottery: Characterized by their detailed motifs and calligraphy, often featuring floral and geometric patterns.
- Pottery of ancient Cyprus
- Islamic pottery
