= Lead-glazed earthenware =

Earthenware with a lead-based ceramic glaze

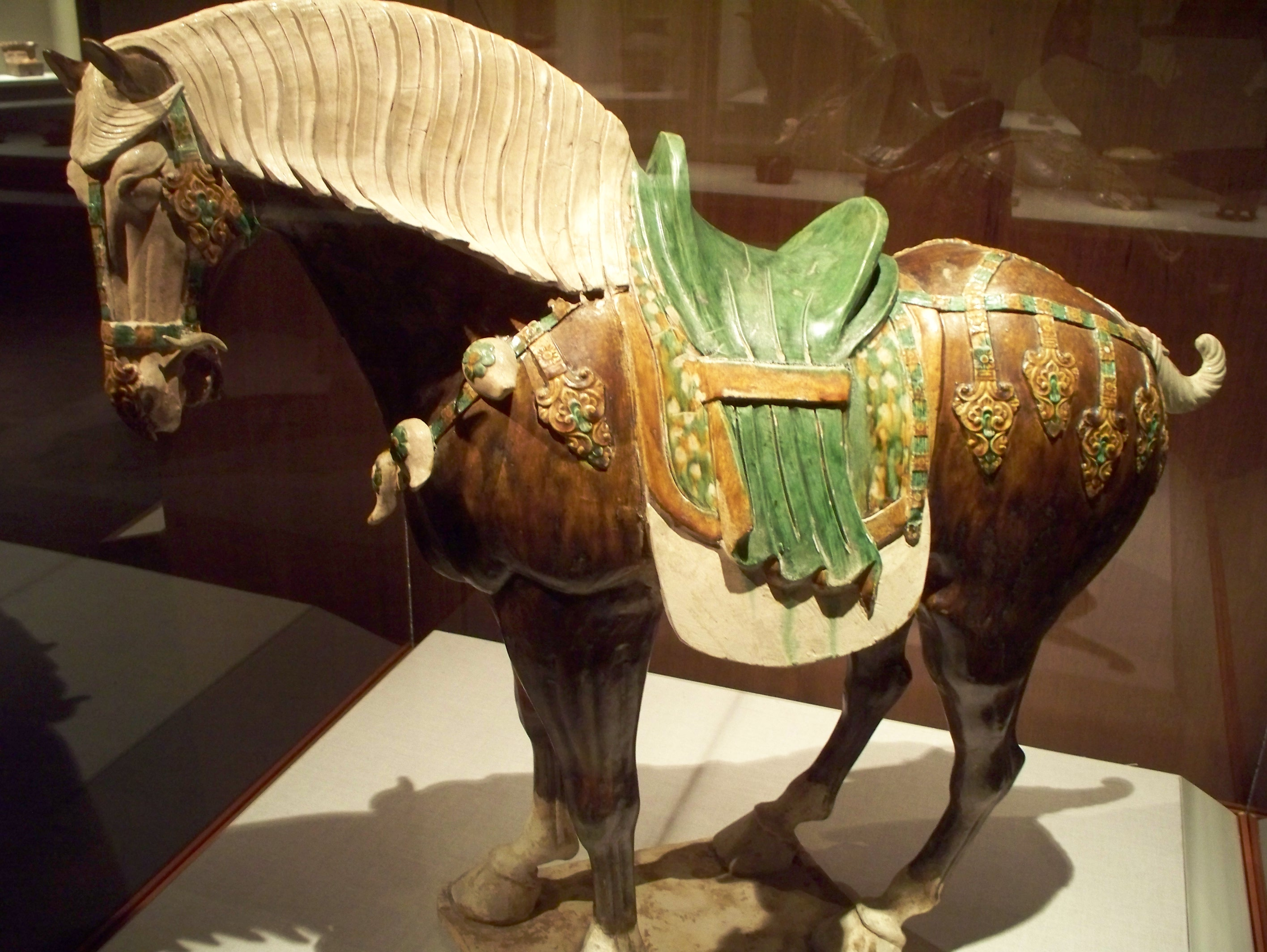
A sancai lead-glazed earthenware saddled horse statuette, Tang dynasty (618–907 AD), coloured lead glazes.

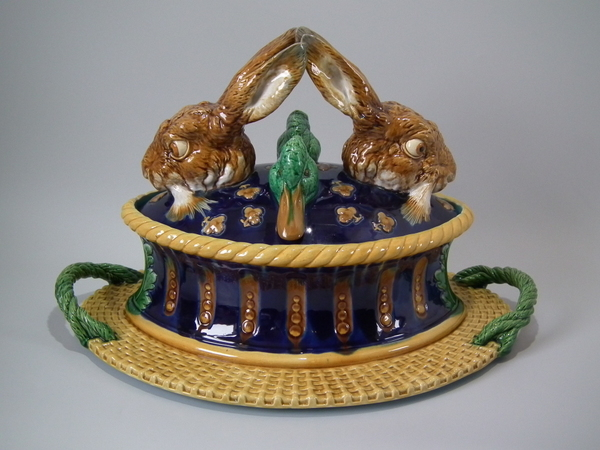
Minton majolica game pie dish, lead-glazed earthenware, c. 1875, an iconic example of High Victorian appetite for innovation with humour/whimsy, coloured lead glazes

Lead-glazed earthenware is one of the traditional types of earthenware with a ceramic glaze, which coats the ceramic bisque body and renders it impervious to liquids, as terracotta itself is not. Plain lead glaze is shiny and transparent after firing. Coloured lead glazes are shiny and either translucent or opaque after firing. Three other traditional techniques are tin-glazed (in fact this is lead glaze with a small amount of tin added), which coats the ware with an opaque white glaze suited for overglaze brush-painted colored enamel designs; salt glaze pottery, also often stoneware; and the feldspathic glazes of Asian porcelain. Modern materials technology has invented new glazes that do not fall into these traditional categories.

In lead glazes, tints provided by impurities render greenish to brownish casts, with aesthetic possibilities that are not easily controlled in the kiln. The Romans used lead glazes for high-quality oil lamps and drinking cups. At the same time in China, green-glazed pottery dating back to the Han period (25–220 AD) gave rise eventually to the sancai ('three-color') Tang dynasty ceramics, where the white clay body was coated with coloured glazes and fired at a temperature of 800 degrees C. Lead oxide was the principal flux in the glaze. Polychrome effects (i.e. the colours) were obtained by using the oxides of copper (which turns green), iron (brownish yellow), and less often manganese (brown) and cobalt (blue).

Much of Roman technology was lost in the West, but coarse lead-glazed earthenwares were universal in medieval Europe and in Colonial America. In England, lead-glazed Stamford ware was produced in Stamford, Lincolnshire as early as the ninth century. It was widely traded across Britain and the near continent. In Italy during the 15th century lead-glazed wares were improved by the incremental addition of tin oxides under the influence of Islamic wares imported through Sicily, giving rise to maiolica, which supplanted lead-glazed wares in all but the most rustic contexts. The French 16th-century Saint-Porchaire ware is lead-glazed earthenware; an early European attempt at rivalling Chinese porcelains, it does not properly qualify as faience, which is a refined tin-glazed earthenware. In 16th-century France Bernard Palissy refined lead-glazed earthenware to a high standard. Victorian majolica is predominantly lead-glazed 'majolica' earthenware, introduced by Mintons in the mid-19th century as a revival of "Palissy ware". Victorian majolica also include Minton's rare tin-glaze products.

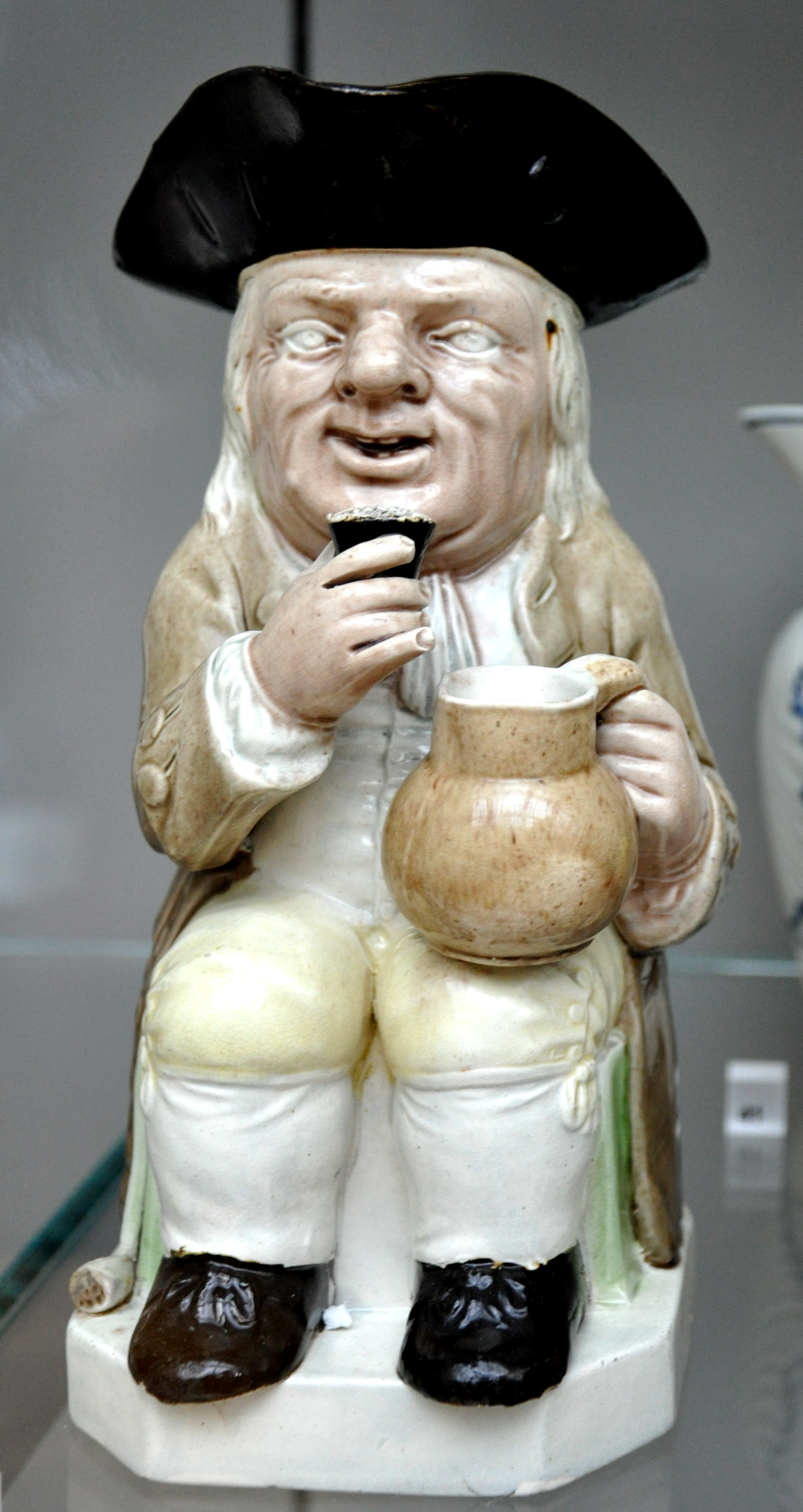
Toby jug made by Ralph Wood the Younger, Burslem, c. 1782–1795 (Victoria & Albert Museum), coloured lead glazes.

Lead-glazed earthenwares in Britain include the Toby jugs, such as those made in the late 18th century by Ralph Wood the Younger at Burslem, Staffordshire.

== See also ==
- Mintons
- Palissy ware
- Victorian majolica
