= RAM press =

Machine used press clay into molded shapes

A RAM press (or ram press) is a machine, invented in the USA in the mid-1940s, that is used to press clay into moulded shapes, such as plates and bowls. In operation a slice of de-aired clay body is placed in between two shaped porous moulds, and vertical movement of the moulds presses the body into the required shape.

== History ==
The RAM process was devised around 1945 by the ceramics engineers Andrew Reif Blackburn and Richard E. Steele. The first RAM Press was made by Harold Dawson in Columbus, Ohio. Blackburn and Steele sold their company to the Wallace Murray Corp. RAM Products Inc. of Columbus, Ohio was set up in 1979 and now manufactures the RAM press, as do other companies. In 1986, RAM Products introduced the 15-ton cub press for use by studio potters.

== Principle of operation ==
In operation a slice of de-aired clay body is placed in between two shaped porous moulds or dies, and vertical movement of the moulds presses the body into the required shape. Pressing causes some water to be forced out of the clay body into the porous die, which stiffens the clay body allowing it to retain its shape. The dies used for RAM pressing are porous and have embedded air channels which allow pressurized air to be forced through the permeable die material to separate the pressed ceramic ware from the die. After pressing, air is forced through the bottom die as the press is opened. This causes the part to be released from the bottom die while adhering to the top die. Once the die is fully open, air is forced through the top die which releases the part onto a tray or into the operator’s hands. Dies are typically made from high strength gypsum cement, but may also be made from porous ceramic.

== Other uses ==
The phrase ram press (in lower case) commonly means the same thing; it is simply used for machines that press items by a mechanical ram, such as with a plunger, piston, force pump, or hydraulic ram.
