= Bernard Palissy =

French Huguenot potter, hydraulics engineer and craftsman

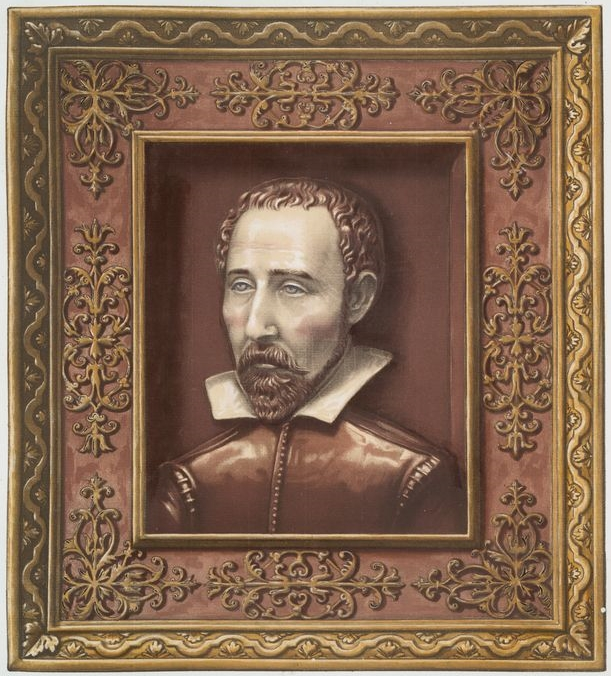
- Bernard Palissy, self-portrait in faience, reproduced in a lithograph
- Occupations: French Huguenot pottery and hydraulics engineer

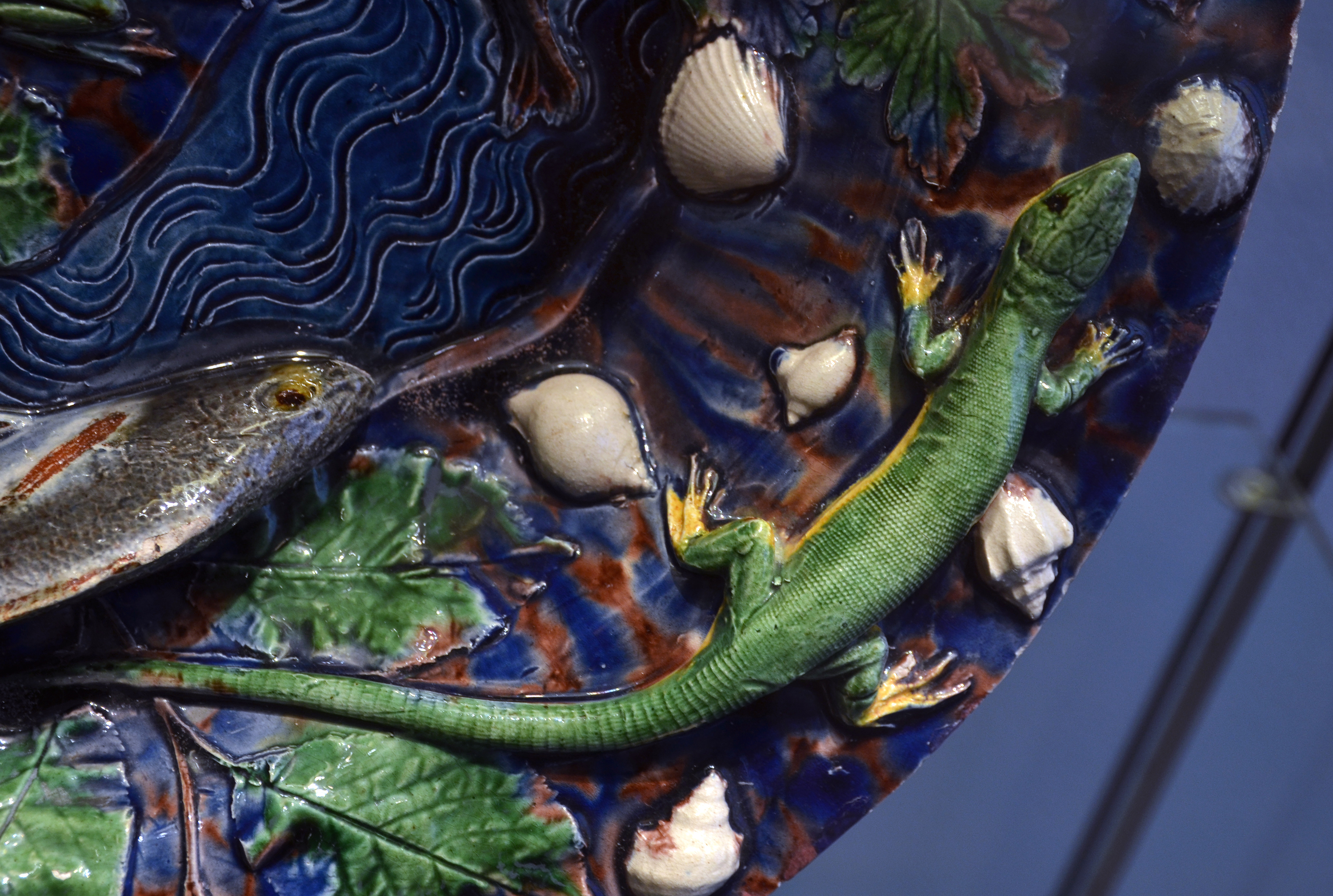
Detail of a Palissy still-life platter of c. 1550 (see below for the whole piece)

Bernard Palissy (French pronunciation: [bɛʁnaʁ palisi]; c. 1510 – c. 1589) was a French Huguenot potter, hydraulics engineer and craftsman, famous for having struggled for sixteen years to imitate Chinese porcelain. He is best known for his so-called "rusticware", typically highly decorated large oval platters featuring small animals in relief among vegetation, the animals apparently often being moulded from casts taken of dead specimens. It is often difficult to distinguish examples from Palissy's own workshop and those of a number of "followers" who rapidly adopted his style. Imitations and adaptations of his style continued to be made in France until roughly 1800, and then revived considerably in the 19th century.

In the 19th century, Palissy's pottery became the inspiration for Mintons Ltd's Victorian majolica, which was exhibited at the London Great Exhibition of 1851 under the name "Palissy ware".

Palissy is known for his contributions to the natural sciences, and is famous for discovering principles of geology, hydrology and fossil formation. A Protestant, Palissy was imprisoned for his belief during the tumultuous French Wars of Religion and sentenced to death. He died of poor treatment in the Bastille in 1589 (1590 according to Burty 1886).

== Early life ==
According to his friend Pierre de L'Estoile, Palissy was born in 1510. The location of Palissy's birth is not certain, but it is believed to be either Saintes, Périgord, Limousin or Agen. He lived most of his life in Saintonge. Palissy was born to a poor family, and while his education did not include Greek or Latin, it did instruct him in practical sciences including geometry and surveying. Early in his life, Palissy was commissioned by the crown to survey the salt marshes of Saintonge. In his memoirs, Palissy tells us that he was apprenticed to a glass painter. At the end of his apprenticeship he spent a year as a wandering journeyman acquiring fresh knowledge in many parts of France, including Guyenne, Languedoc, Provence, Dauphiné, Burgundy and the Loire. He later traveled north to the Low Countries, perhaps even in the Rhine Provinces of Germany, and to Italy.

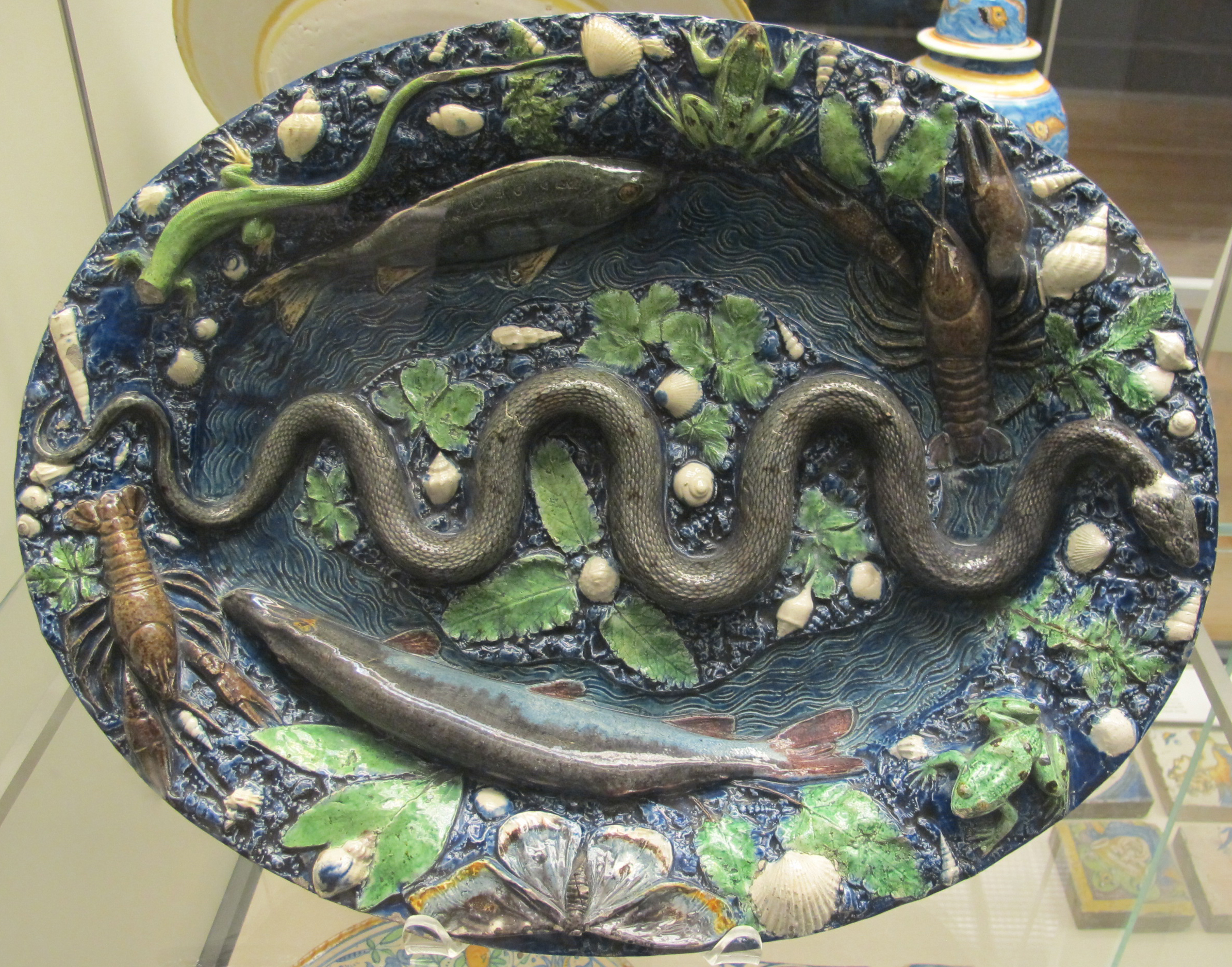
Workshop of Palissy, rusticware platter, 1575–1600

Palissy returned to Saintonge where he married and had children. Other than what he tells us in his autobiography, namely that he worked as a portrait painter, glass painter, and land surveyor, we have little record of how he lived during the first years of his married life.

== Interest in ceramics ==
In 1539 or 1540, Palissy was shown a white enamelled cup that astonished him, and he began a project to determine the nature of its production. The piece of fine white pottery may have derived from Faenza, Urbino, Saint-Porchaire or even China. In Palissy's time pottery covered with beautiful white tin-glaze painted with enamels was manufactured throughout Italy, Spain, Germany and the South of France. A man as travelled and as acute as Palissy, however, would have been acquainted with its appearance and properties.

At the neighboring village of La Chapelle-des-Pots, Palissy mastered the rudiments of peasant pottery as it was practised in the 16th century. He may also have learned of manufacture of European tin-enamelled pottery. In his work Palissy produced ceramics using a great many ingredients including tin, lead, iron, steel, antimony, sapphire, copper, sand, saltwort, pearlash, and litharge.

== Rustic pottery ==
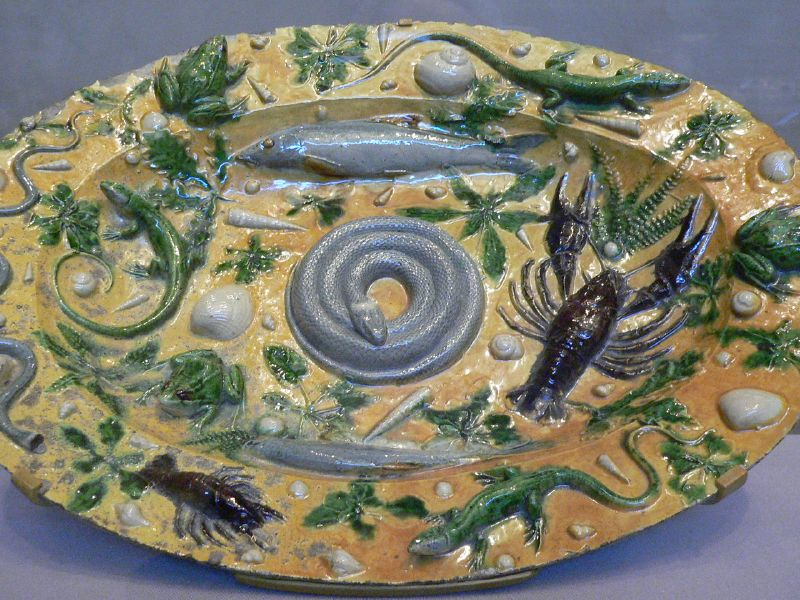
Rusticware featuring casts of sea life (1550)

For nearly sixteen years Palissy labored to recreate the pottery that he had seen, working with the utmost diligence but never succeeding. At times he and his family were reduced to poverty; he is said to have burned his furniture and the floor boards of his house to feed the fires of his furnaces. Meanwhile, he endured the reproaches of his wife, who, with their children clamouring for food, likely regarded her husband's endeavors as little short of insanity. All these struggles and failures are faithfully recorded by Palissy in his autobiography.

Palissy failed to discover the secrets of Chinese porcelain or white tin-glaze maiolica, but he created a style of rustic pottery, called "Palissy ware," for which he is now famous. Analysis confirms that Palissy used coloured lead glazes, lead silicates with added metal oxides of copper [for green], cobalt [for blue], manganese [for brown and black], or iron [for yellow ochre], with a small addition of tin [for opacity] to some of the glazes. The pottery is decorated with reliefs mimicking wildlife from Palissy's native Saintonge marshes. These include fish, crustaceans, reptiles, ferns, and flowers.

In 1542, a peasant revolt against the "gabelle" salt tax in Saintonge resulted in royal forces, headed by the Duc de Montmorency, arriving near Palissy's home. The duke was impressed by Palissy's artistry and commissioned him to build retreats at the Château d'Écouen and Meudon. Palissy's work there included the construction of wild gardens and ceramic creatures, following a romantic style similar to that of Italian artists Vasari, Cellini, and Michelangelo, and foreshadowing the baroque period.

== Work in Paris ==
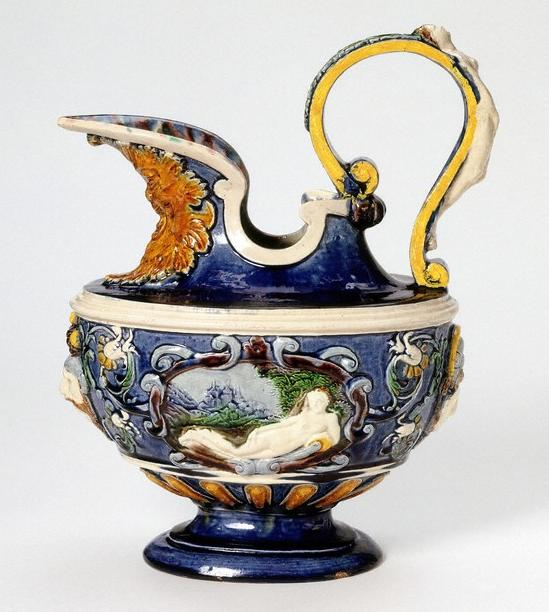
Ewer, 1580–1600, by follower of Bernard Palissy, Victoria and Albert Museum, no. 7178-1860

In 1548 Palissy was brought to Paris under the protection of Montmorency and Catherine des Medicis. Despite his conversion to Protestantism in 1546, in a departure from the established Catholic religion, Catherine asked Palissy to construct gardens for her in the Tuileries. In 1562, she gave him an official title in her court: "the king's inventor of rustic figurines."

Palissy was outspoken in his Protestant religious beliefs; he sometimes chastised influential officials by quoting from the prophetic books of the Old Testament. According to contemporaries, Palissy would criticize traders, judges, or Parliamentary counsellors, and benefices by citing the Book of Ezekiel: "They are accursed, damned, and lost... Woe be to you, shepherds, who eat the fat and clothe you with the wool, and leave my flock scattered upon the mountains."

Although Palissy was Protestant, these nobles protected him from the ordinances of the parliament of Bordeaux. In 1562, it seized the property of all the Protestants in this district. Palissy's workshops and kilns were destroyed, but he was saved. By the interposition of the all-powerful constable, he was appointed inventor of rustic pottery to the king and the queen-mother.

Around 1563, under royal protection, he was allowed to establish a fresh pottery works in Paris in the vicinity of the royal palace of the Louvre. The site of his kilns afterward became included within a portion of the Tuileries Garden. For about twenty-five years from this date, Palissy lived and worked in Paris. He appears to have remained a personal favorite of Catherine de' Medici and of her sons, in spite of his Protestantism. Catherine may have saved him from the bloodshed of Saint Bartholemew's Day Massacre in 1572.

While he was working for the court, he produced numerous and varied works. In addition to continuing rustic figurines, he made a large number of dishes and plaques ornamented with scriptural or mythological subjects in relief. He seems to have made reproductions of pewter dishes of François Briot and other metal workers of the period.

== Lectures on natural science ==
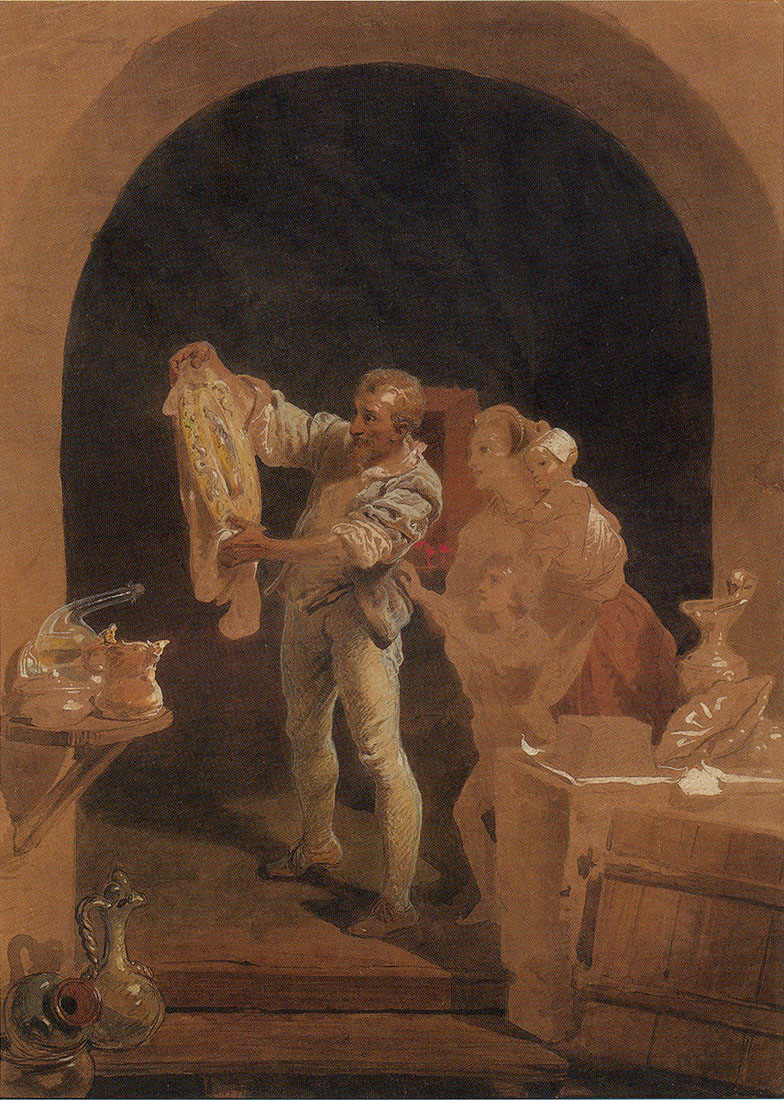
Bernard Palissy by Mihály Zichy

During this period Palissy gave several series of public lectures on natural history, the entrance fee being one crown, a large fee for those days. His ideas of springs and underground waters were published in his Discours admirables, de la nature des eaux et fontaines, tant naturelles qu'artificielles, des metaux, des sels et salines, des pierres, des terres, du feu et des maux (Paris, 1580). While Aristotle and Wang Chong correctly hypothesized about the role of precipitation in the water cycle, Palissy was the first to accurately surmise that rainfall alone was sufficient for the process and that rising underground water played no vital part. He was one of the first Europeans to enunciate theory consistent with today's understandings of the origin of fossils. That and his practical application of Alexandrian theoretical works on hydraulics to the social issue of delivering public water to cities, were far in advance of the general knowledge of his time.

Palissy maintained that experience or practice should inform theory, which was useless without empirical foundations. He furthermore argued that scientific knowledge should be derived from observation and practice before classical philosophy:

If things conceived in the mind could be executed, [alchemists] would do great things... [We must] confess that practice is the source of theory... By experiment I prove in several places that the theory of several philosophers is false, even of the most renowned and the most ancient.

— Bernard Palissy, (quoted by Henry Morley in 1853)

Palissy described systems for acquiring or transporting water, and for insuring its quality, adding that any unable to reproduce his instructions were free to contact him through his publisher. He elaborated upon a theory of hydrothermal vents, volcanoes and earthquakes, which he attributed to a mixture of volatile substances and combustion beneath the earth surface. Palissy furthermore correctly surmised the origin of springs in his study of hydrology and geology.

Palissy correctly maintained that fossils were the remains of once living organisms, and contested the prevailing view that they had been produced by the biblical flood, or by astrological influence. He argued that minerals, dissolving into water to form "congelative water," would precipitate and thereby petrify once living organisms in order to create fossils.

== Imprisonment and death ==
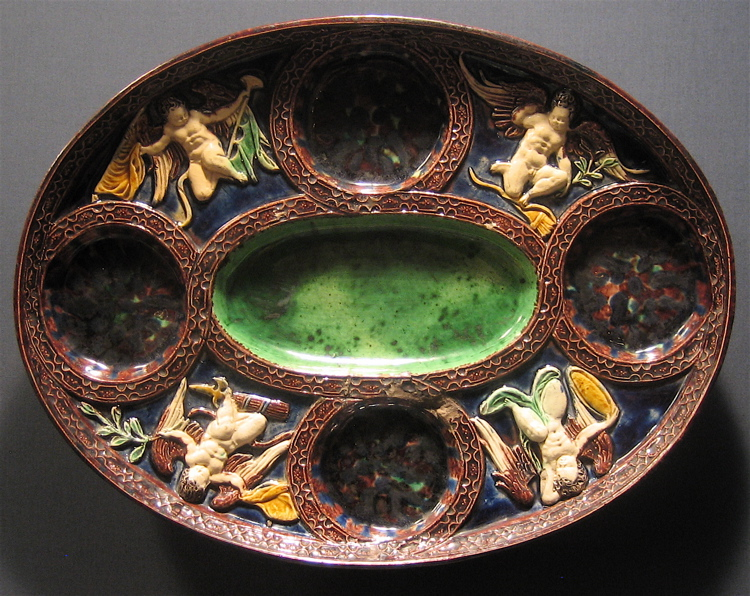
Oval Dish with Winged Putti

The close of Palissy's life was quite in keeping with his active and stormy youth. Despite the protection of the nobles and the court, the fanatical outburst of 1588 associated with the War of the Three Henrys led to his being thrown into the Bastille. According to D'Aubigné and fellow Protestants, Henry III offered Palissy his freedom if he would recant, though Palissy refused. Condemned to death when nearly eighty years of age, he died in a Bastille dungeon in 1590. Friend, chronicler and fellow prisoner Pierre de L'Estoile later recounted Palissy's fate:

In this same year 1590, master Bernard Palissy died in the dungeons of the Bastille, a prisoner for his religion, aged 80 years, and killed by misery, need and poor treatment. With him were three other women detained as prisoners also for their religion, themselves strangled by hunger or vermin... The very good woman who brought me the news had returned from the Bastille, where she had inquired about Palissy's condition. There she found Palissy had died, and was told that if she wanted to see him, she could find him on the ramparts with the dogs, where he had been placed since he was a dog himself.

— Pierre L'Estoile

== In fiction ==
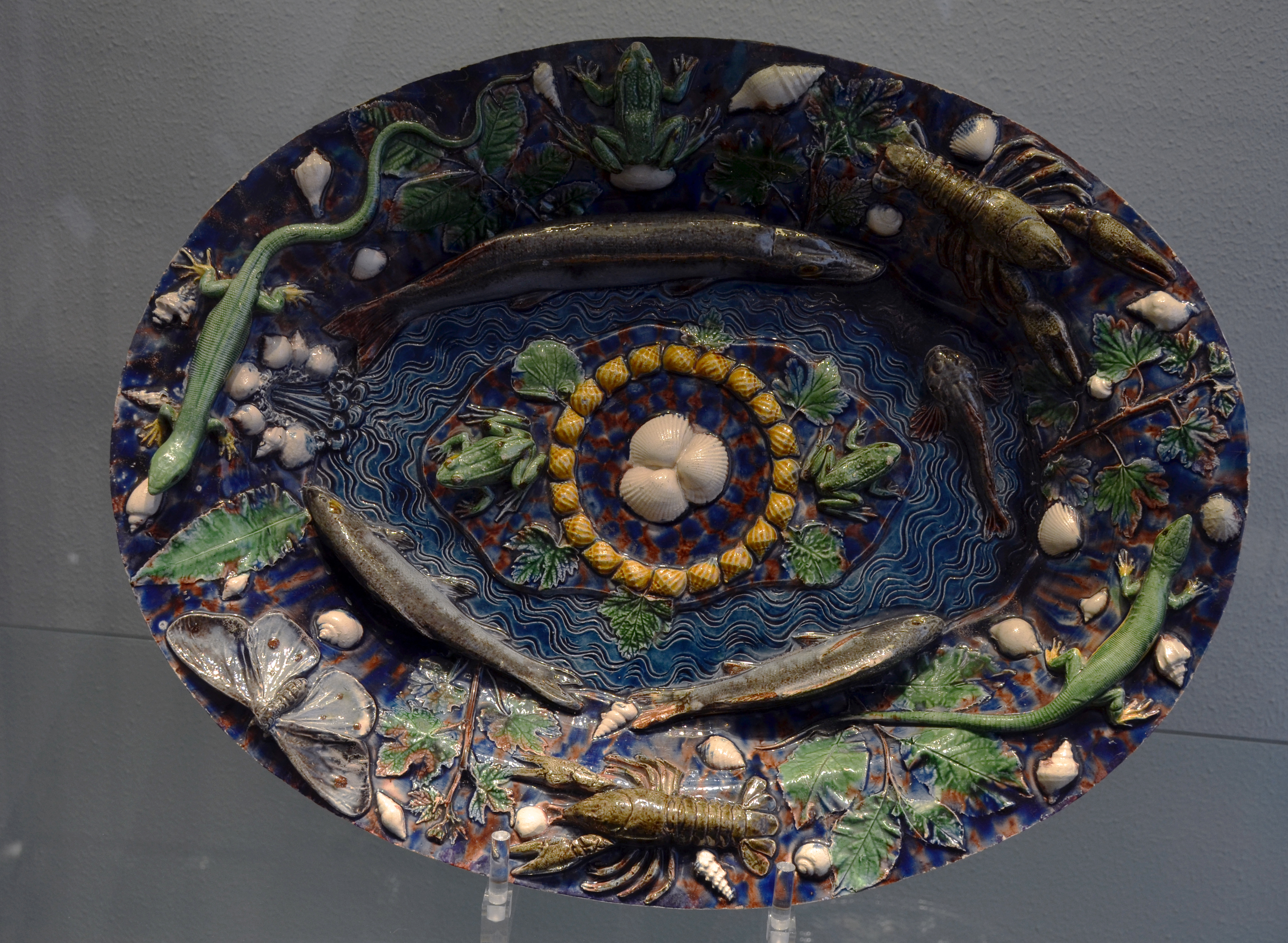
Rusticware platter (detail shown above)

In Alexandre Dumas's The Count of Monte Cristo, Palissy is mentioned when the author describes the opulence of a character's apartment: "The rest of the furniture of this privileged apartment consisted of old cabinets, filled with Chinese porcelain and Japanese vases, Lucca della Robbia faience, and Palissy platters; of old arm-chairs, in which perhaps had sat Henry IV."

Marcel Proust mentions Palissy in the third volume of Remembrance of Things Past: "...and a fish cooked in a court-bouillon was brought in on a long earthenware platter, on which, standing out in relief on a bed of bluish herbs, intact but still contorted from having been dropped alive into boiling water, surrounded by a ring of satellite shell-fish, of animalcules, crabs, shrimps, and mussels, it had the appearance of a ceramic dish by Bernard Palissy."

In Michel Zévaco's Les Pardaillan, Jean de Pardaillan helps Pallissy in Bastille, and leaves him free. His guilt is described as "make angry the fictional Catherine de' Medici"

Palissy's life and work are described in A.S. Byatt's The Children's Book. Palissy serves as an inspiration to the potter Benedict Fludd and his apprentice, Philip Warren.

Palissy figures as one of nineteen exemplary heroes in a series written by Uruguayan author Horacio Quiroga that was first published in 1927 in the popular Argentine weekly Caras y Caretas. Author Léonard N. Amico has produced a recent English language biography.

In the chapter on 'Shells', Gaston Bachelard, in his poetics of space, describes in some detail Palissy's description of a natural fortress. It is constructed on the principle of a shell, with rough exterior and smooth interior in the form of a citadel. (Poetics of Space: Beacon Press. Ed 1994. XI. pp 127–132)

== See also ==
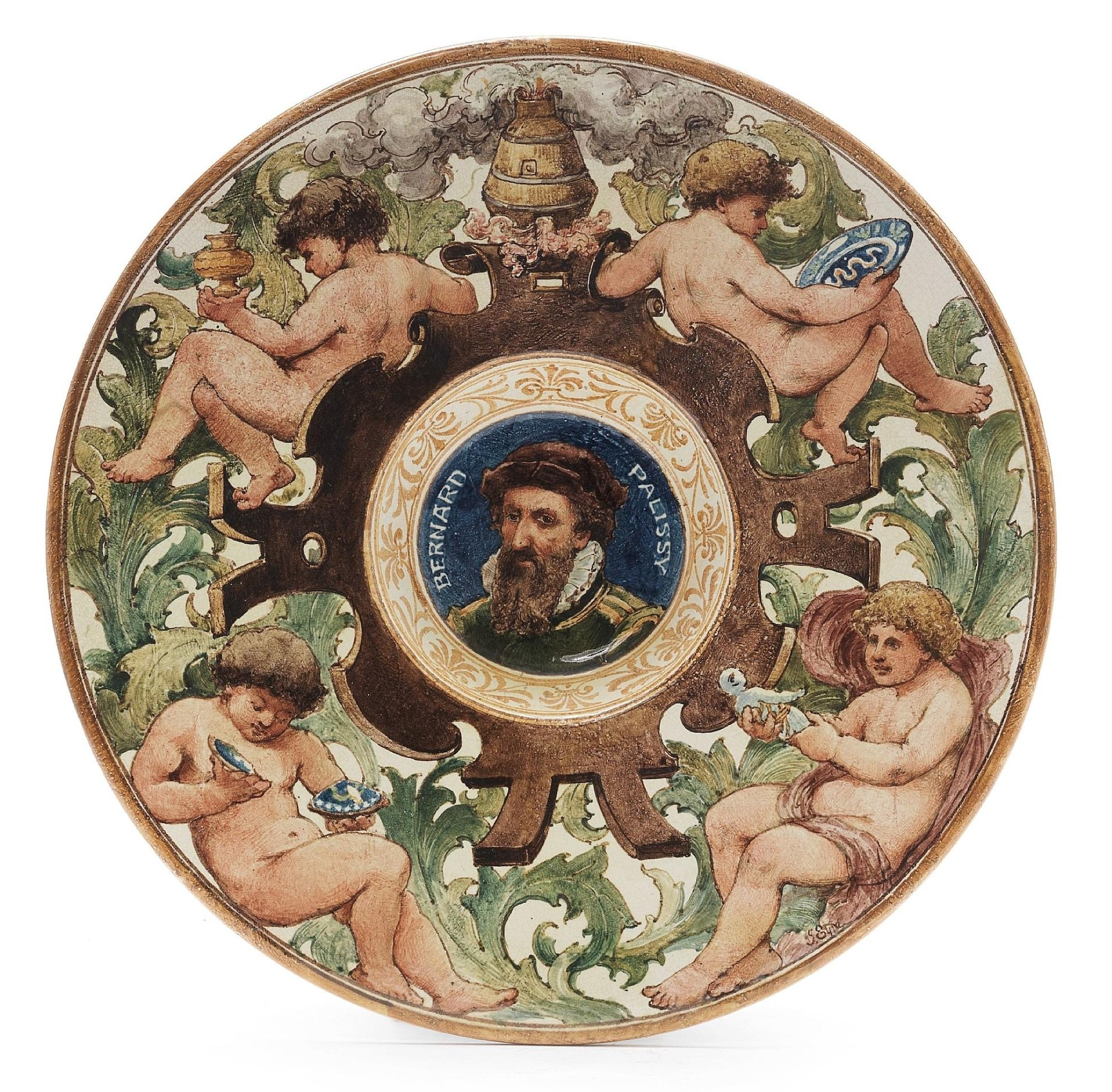
Faience commemorative plaque for Bernard Palissy by 19th-century artist John Eyre. The top-right cherub is painted holding a Palissy rusticware platter.

- Lead-glazed earthenware
- Majolica
