= Palissy ware =

19th-century term for a style of ceramics

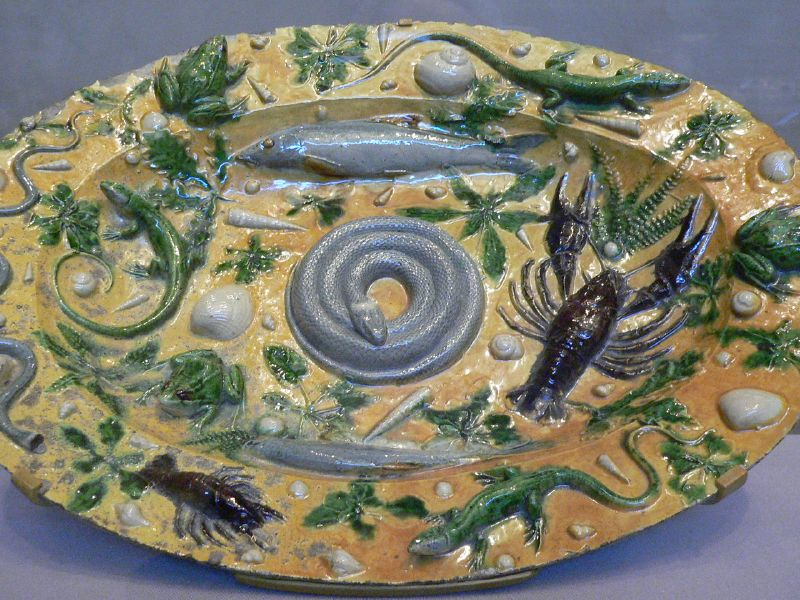
French Palissy ware dish, c. 1550

Palissy ware is a 19th-century term for ceramics produced in the style of the famous French potter Bernard Palissy (c. 1510–90), who referred to his own work in the familiar manner as rustique ("in the rustic style"). It is therefore also known as rusticware. Palissy's distinctive style of polychrome lead-glazed earthenware in a sombre earth-toned palette, using naturalistic scenes of plants and animals cast from life, was much imitated by other potters both in his own lifetime and especially in the 19th century. In this revival, pottery in Palissy's style was produced by Charles-Jean Avisseau of Tours, who rediscovered Palissy's techniques in 1843, his relatives the Landais family of Tours, Georges Pull of Paris, Maurice, and Barbizet.

The number of 16th-century pieces attributed to Palissy himself is now much less than in the past, and attributions tend to be cautious, as for example: "workshop or imitator or follower of Palissy".

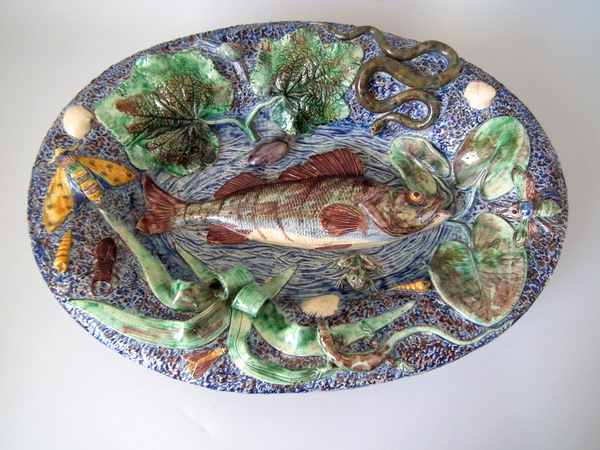
French Palissy ware dish, 17.7ins., c.1870, maker Barbizet, depicting fish, reptiles, insects and leaves.

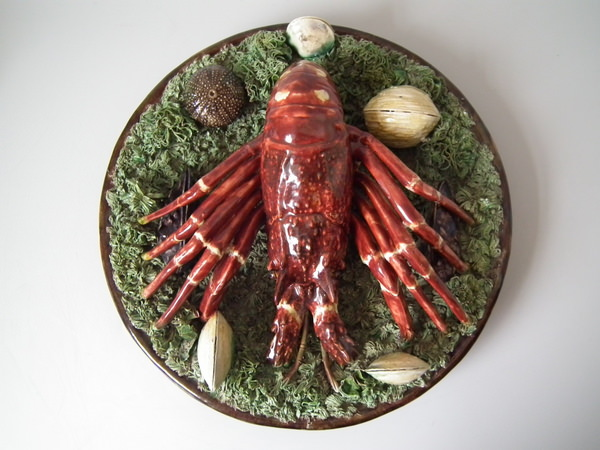
Portuguese Palissy ware wall plate 12.2 in, c. 1880, maker Jose F Sousa depicting crayfish, mussels, sea urchin and shells

Portuguese Palissy ware was produced by the potteries of Mafra, Jose Alves Cunha, José Francisco de Sousa, Cezar, Herculano Elias, and Augusto Baptista de Carvalho. Twentieth-century reproductions are extremely common. It is now difficult to identify which 16th-century works in the rustique manner are actually from Palissy's own workshop except by comparison with either fragments excavated in 1878 from remains of the grotto that he certainly decorated at the Tuileries Palace for Catherine de' Medici, who called him to Paris in 1566 or from excavations at the site of his Paris workshop in the Palais du Louvre. Many museums have now become cautious in their attributions.

This distinctive style of pottery is characterized by three-dimensional modeled, often aquatic, animals such as snakes, fish, lizards, frogs, and snails arranged onto large platters (wall plates, wall platters, chargers). Typically, each component is modeled and painted individually.

Palissy ware is also the name given by Minton & Co for the earthenware later known as 'majolica', decorated with a mostly new range of coloured glazes.

"...what is now known as majolica was a range of vibrantly coloured lead glazes launched in 1849 as Palissy ware. Only later did these become known as majolica ware". Victoria and Albert Museum.

A significant collection of Palissy ware is housed in the New Orleans Museum of Art, donated by the actress and writer Brooke Hayward.
