= Sancai =

Coloured decoration of Chinese pottery

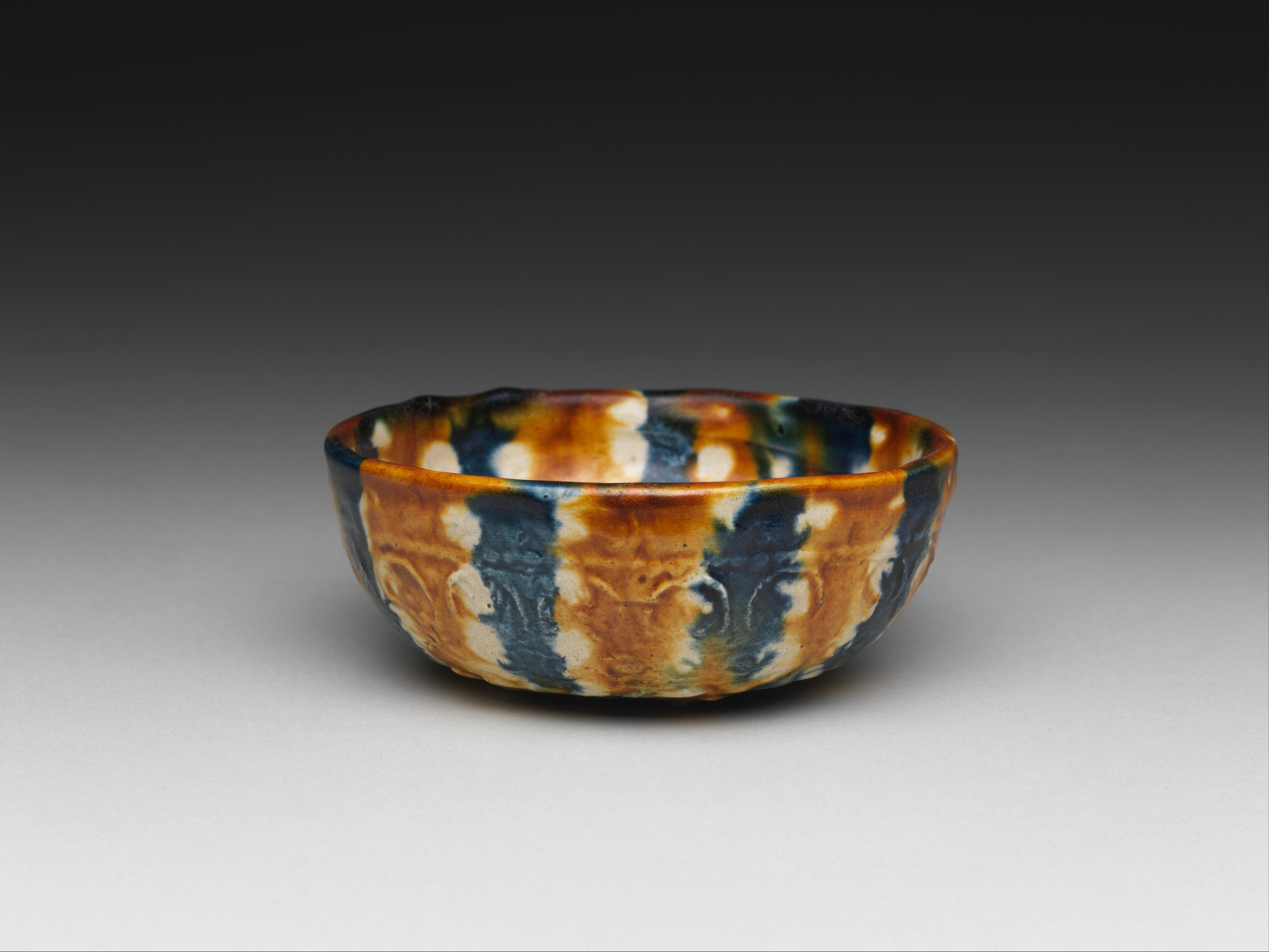
- Sancai-glazed bowl, Tang dynasty (7th–10th century). Metropolitan Museum of Art.
- Branch: Chinese ceramics
- Years active: Tang dynasty (7th–10th century); revived in Liao, Song, and Ming dynasties
- Location: Gongyi and Luoyang, Henan; Tongchuan, Shaanxi; Xi'an, Shaanxi
- Influences: Han dynasty lead-glazed pottery
- Influenced: Cizhou ware, Nara three-color ware (Japan), Silla three-color ware (Korea)

Sancai (Chinese: 三彩; pinyin: sāncǎi; lit. 'three colours') is a versatile type of decoration on Chinese pottery and other painted pieces using glazes or slip, predominantly in the three colours of brown (or amber), green, and a creamy off-white. It is particularly associated with the Tang dynasty (618–907) and its tomb figures, appearing around 700. Therefore, it is commonly referred to as Chinese: 唐三彩 Tang Sancai in Chinese. Tang sancai wares were sometimes referred in China and the West as egg-and-spinach by dealers, for their use of green, yellow, and white, especially when combined with a streaked effect.

The Tang dynasty three-color glazed pottery is the treasure of ancient Chinese ceramic firing techniques. It is a kind of low-temperature glazed pottery popular in the Tang dynasty. The glaze has yellow, green, white, brown, blue, black and other colours. The yellow, green, and white colour-based are predominant, so people call it "Tang Sancai". Because the Tang Sancai was unearthed in Luoyang earliest and is most found in Luoyang, it is also known as "Luoyang Tang Sancai".

It uses lead-glazed earthenware, and although two firings were needed, it was easier and therefore cheaper to make than Chinese porcelain or celadon, and suitable for making large figures, if necessary made up of several moulded sections assembled after a first firing. Vessels, mostly rather small and made for burial, were made in the technique as well as figures. Small plates with three feet, typically about 18–40 cm (7–16 inches) across, called "offering-trays", are a distinctive type, with more carefully controlled decoration than other types of pieces.

The white may come from the natural colour of the fired clay, sometimes coated with a transparent glaze, or there may be a white slip. The brown and green colours came from adding metal oxides to a lead glaze, and in fact blues and blacks are also found. The blue came from adding imported cobalt, and was therefore more expensive and used sparingly, often on smaller pieces.

== Technique ==
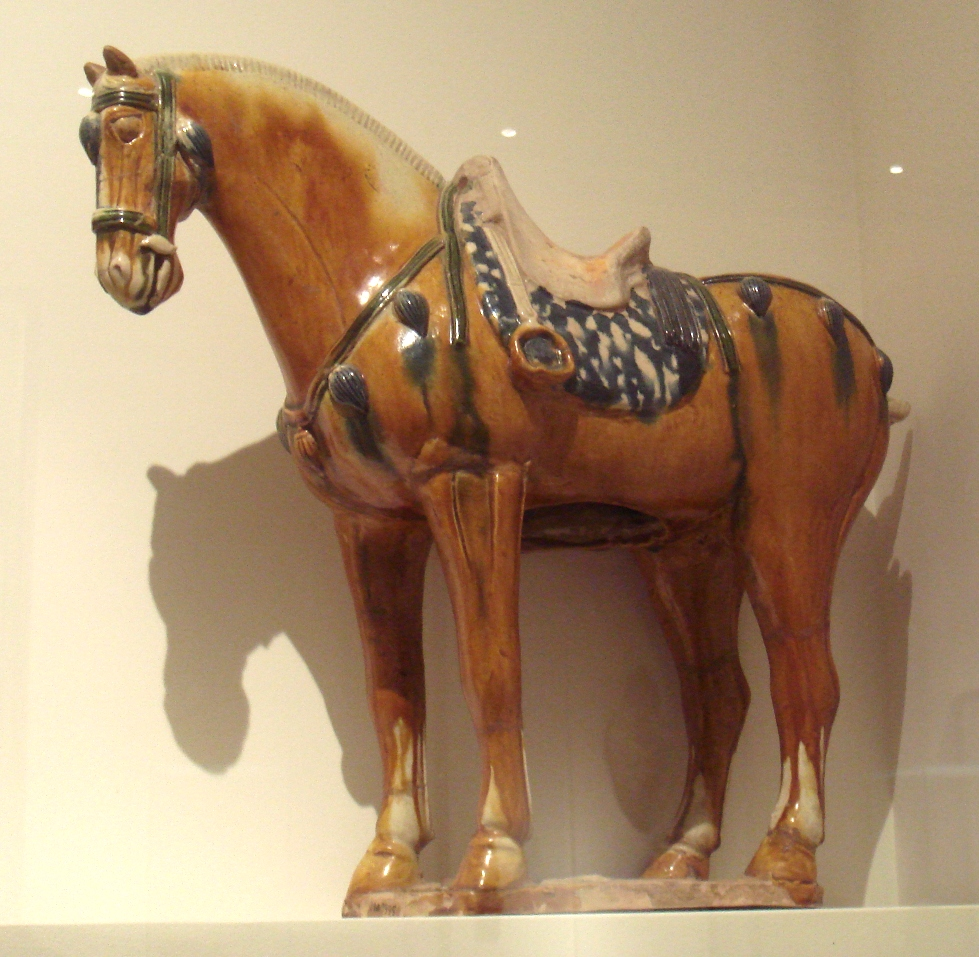
Tang dynasty tomb figure, sancai horse, 7–8th century, also using blue, as on the saddle

The body of sancai ceramics was made of white clay, coated with coloured glaze, and fired at a temperature of 800 degrees Celsius. Sancai is a type of lead-glazed earthenware: lead oxide was the principal flux in the glaze, often mixed with quartz in the proportion of 3:1. The polychrome effect was obtained by using as colouring agents copper (which turns green), iron (which turns brownish yellow), and less often manganese and cobalt (which turns blue).

Detail of a sancai tomb guardian

At kiln sites located at Tongchuan, Neiqui county in Hebei and Gongxian in Henan, the clays used for burial wares were similar to those used by Tang potters. The burial wares were fired at a lower temperature than contemporaneous whitewares. Large figures made for grave goods in burials ("burial wares), such as the well-known Tang dynasty tomb figures with people, camels and horses, were cast in sections, in moulds with the parts luted together using clay slip. In some cases, a degree of individuality was imparted to the assembled figurines by hand-carving.

When used together, the glazes ran into each other at the edges, giving much of the character of the decoration. Apart from the precisely painted offering-trays, which mostly have moulded contours for the areas in different colours, in most pieces the colours are applied loosely, even carelessly. Splashing and spotting are often used, and on both vessels and figures the colours often do not attempt to follow relief areas or different parts of the bodies. Decorative motifs, in painting or relief, are borrowed from textiles, jewellery and metalwork.

== Development ==
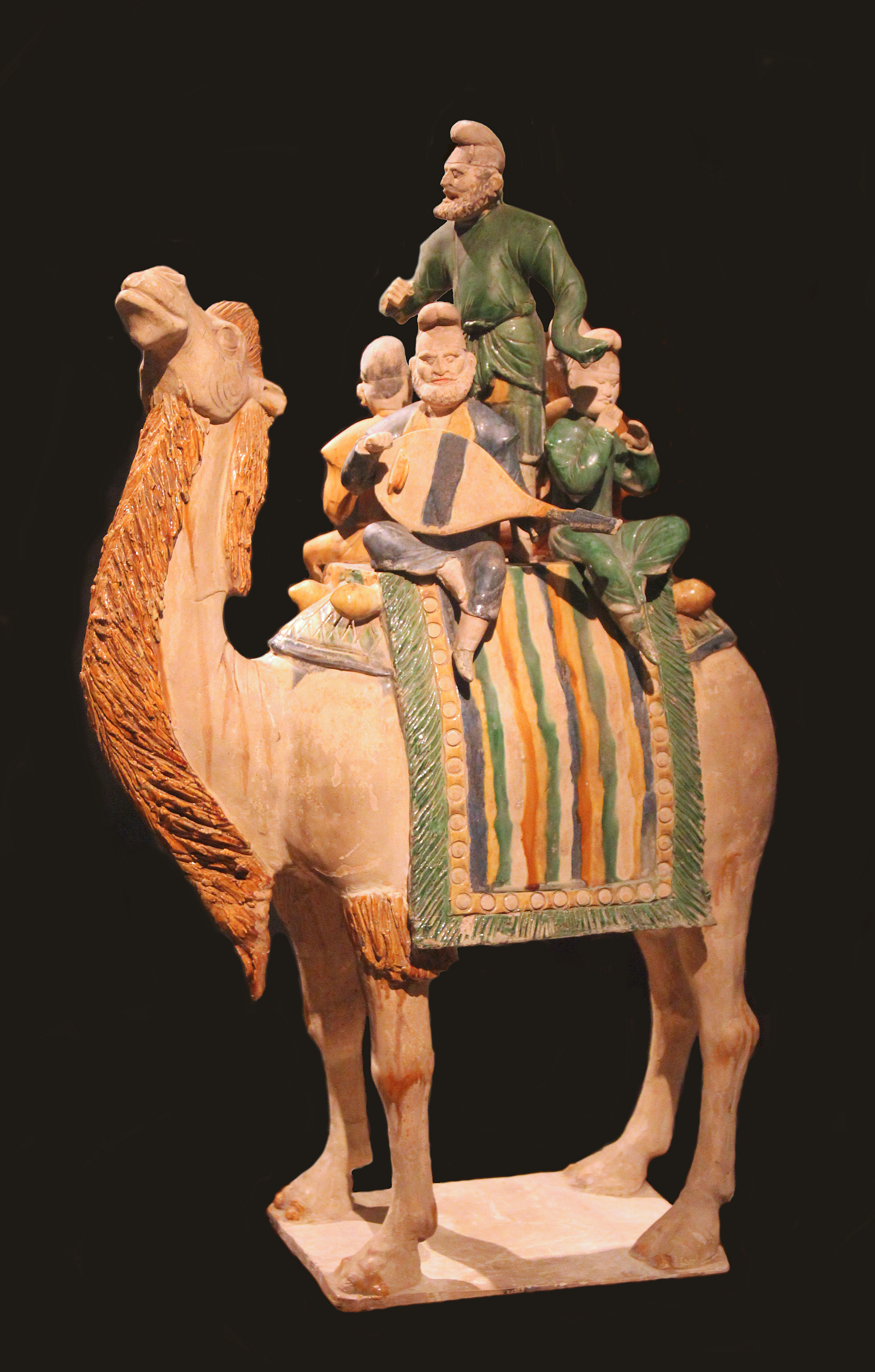
Foreign musicians on camel. Sancai glaze, 723 AD, Xi'an.

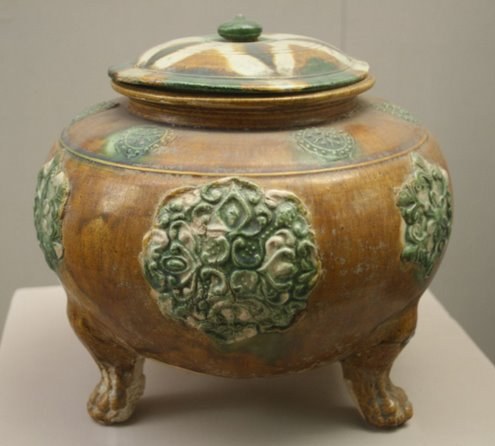
Tang footed jar with relief decoration

Sancai wares were made in north China using white and buff-firing secondary kaolins and fire clays. Sancai follows the development of green-glazed pottery dating back to the Han period (25–220 AD); the brown glaze was also known to the Han, but they only very rarely mixed the two in a single piece. After the Han the use of these glazes almost disappears for some four hundred years, which has rather puzzled experts. The great majority of survivals are from burial goods, which in the intervening period are painted with pigments that are not fired (and so have now mostly fallen off the piece). But a trickle of pieces shows a "tenuous lead-glazing tradition linking Han to Sui and T'ang".

Predecessors to the sancai style can also be seen in some Northern Qi (550–577) ceramic works. Northern Qi tombs have revealed some beautiful artifacts, such as porcellaneous ware with splashed green designs, previously thought to have been developed under the Tang dynasty.

The full polychrome sancai combination appears shortly before the end of the 7th century. After only about 70 years, the production of tomb figures seems to have ceased almost completely with the very disruptive An Lushan Rebellion of 755, followed by a Tibetan invasion of the north in 763, but the vessels continued for another fifty years or more.

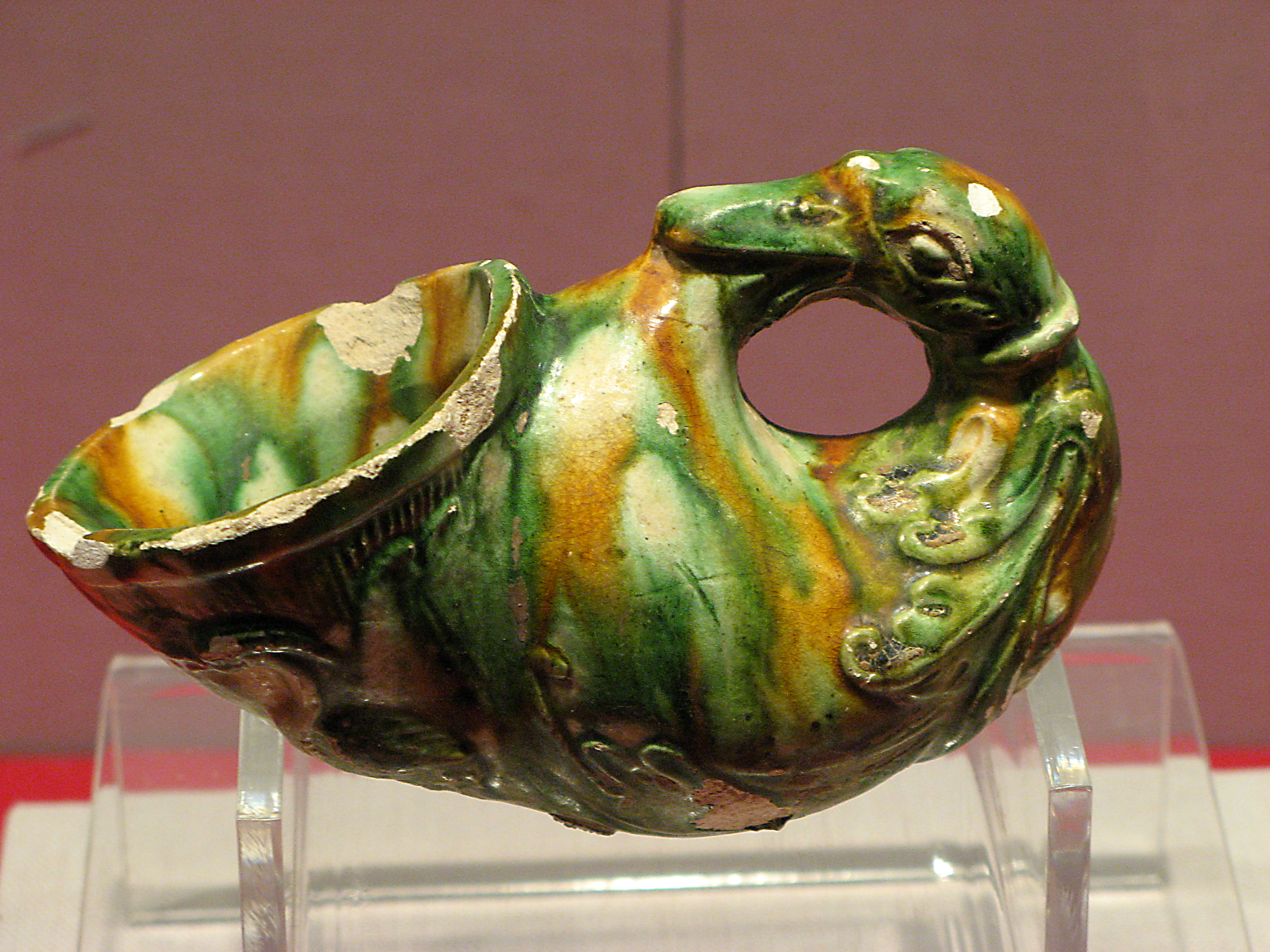
Sancai rhyton with duck's head.

After another long gap, sancai was again produced from the late Tang and in the Liao dynasty (907–1125, a breakaway foreign dynasty in the far north). It was often used for large items made for temples. Sets of sancai luohan figures up to life-size were often displayed in special luohan halls in temples. Few of these that remained in place survived the Cultural Revolution. The Yixian glazed pottery luohans are a Liao dynasty set that is now distributed between various Western museums, and so very well known. Unusually, these were constructed around internal supporting iron bars. Pairs of large guardian figures flanking shrines were also made.

== Vessels ==
The tomb figures are covered by their own article. The other type of sancai pieces was vessels in a number of shapes, but none very large, all found almost exclusively in burials, and perhaps only ever made for them. The shapes are mostly characterized by "contrasting contours and almost extravagant roundness, expanding to the point almost of bursting". Many adapt non-Chinese shapes, mostly from metalwork, although some can be traced back to ancient Greek pottery, and may be described by the Greek terms amphora (two-handled vase) and oinochoe (jug or ewer with spout and a handle), the last usually having a spout in the form of the head of a bird or fenghuang (Chinese phoenix). These derive from "Hellenistic survivals in the oasis states and the cities of western Central Asia". The handles of amphorae often rejoin the body in a dragon's head biting the rim. Other shapes are traditionally Chinese, such as the lidded jar. It is possible, as has also been suggested for much ancient Greek pottery, that the ceramic vessels were cheaper copies for burial of the vessels in metal, probably silver, that the deceased used or aspired to in life, just as the tomb figures replicated servants and animals.

Many pieces have relief decoration, either applied by sprigging, or in the moulds used to make many pieces, though simple shapes were still made on the potter's wheel.

== Gallery ==
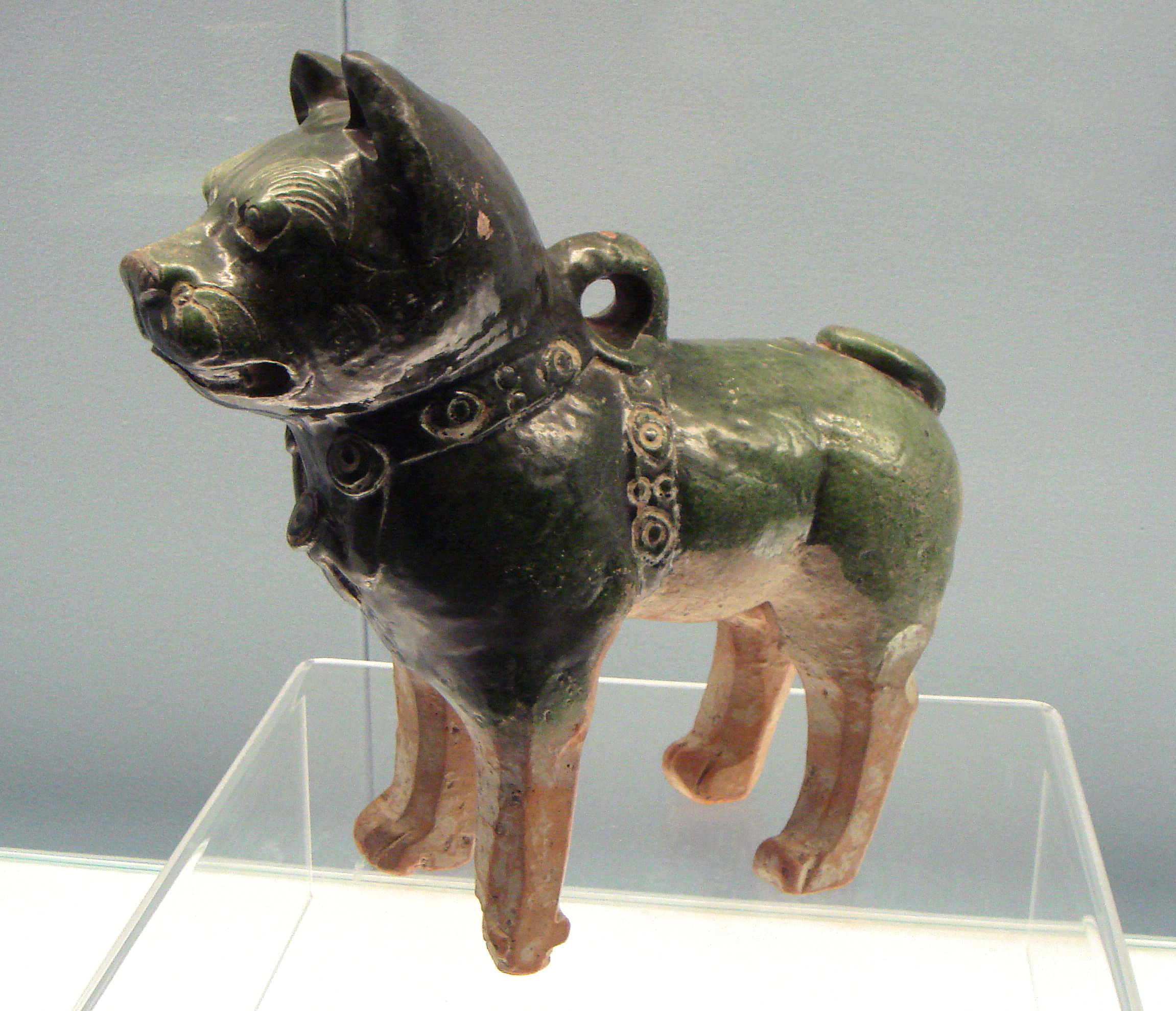
Before sancai: Green-glazed pottery dog, Eastern Han, 25-220 AD.

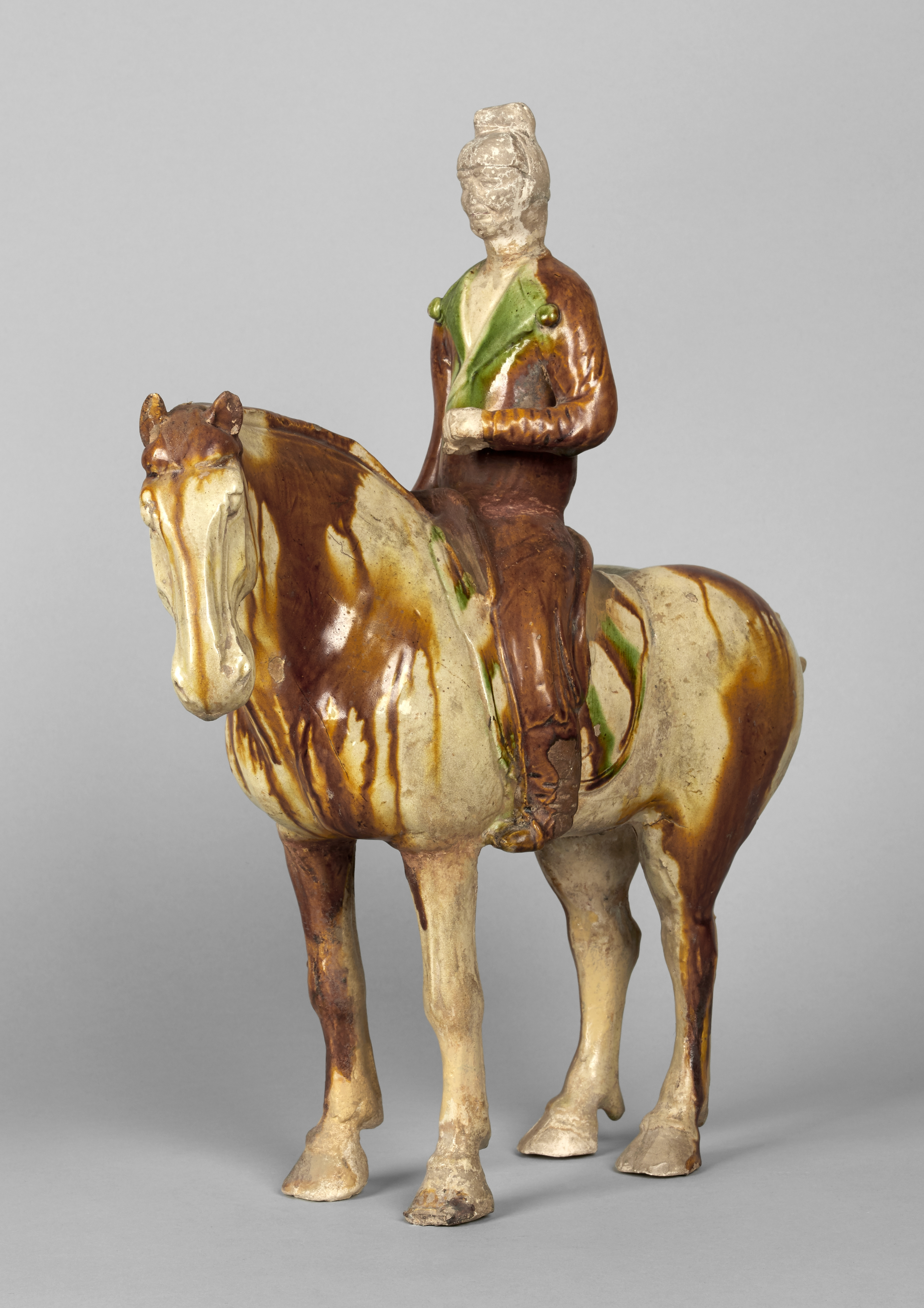
Horse rider, Tang dynasty, 618-907

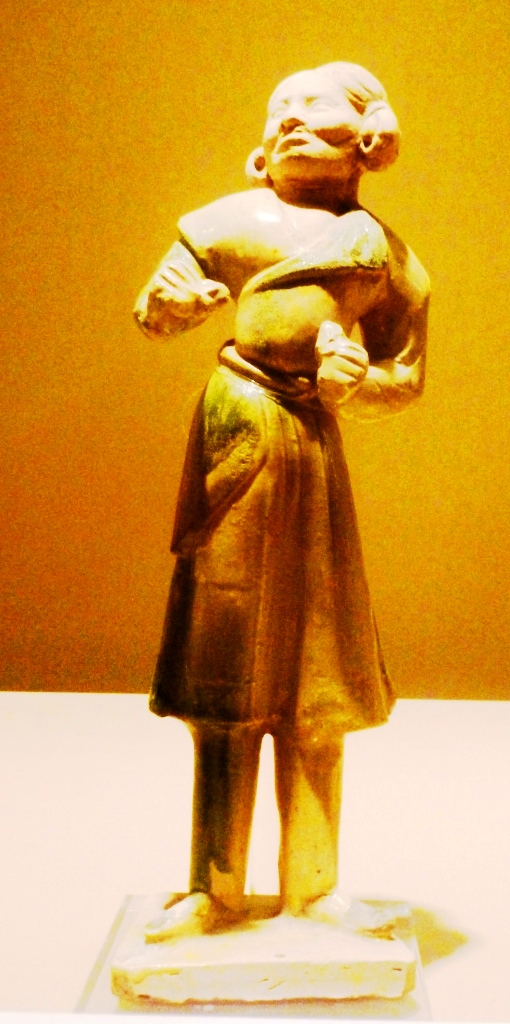
Sancai (Tri-colored) figure of a Tibetan woman. Tang dynasty. Eastern suburbs of Xi'an

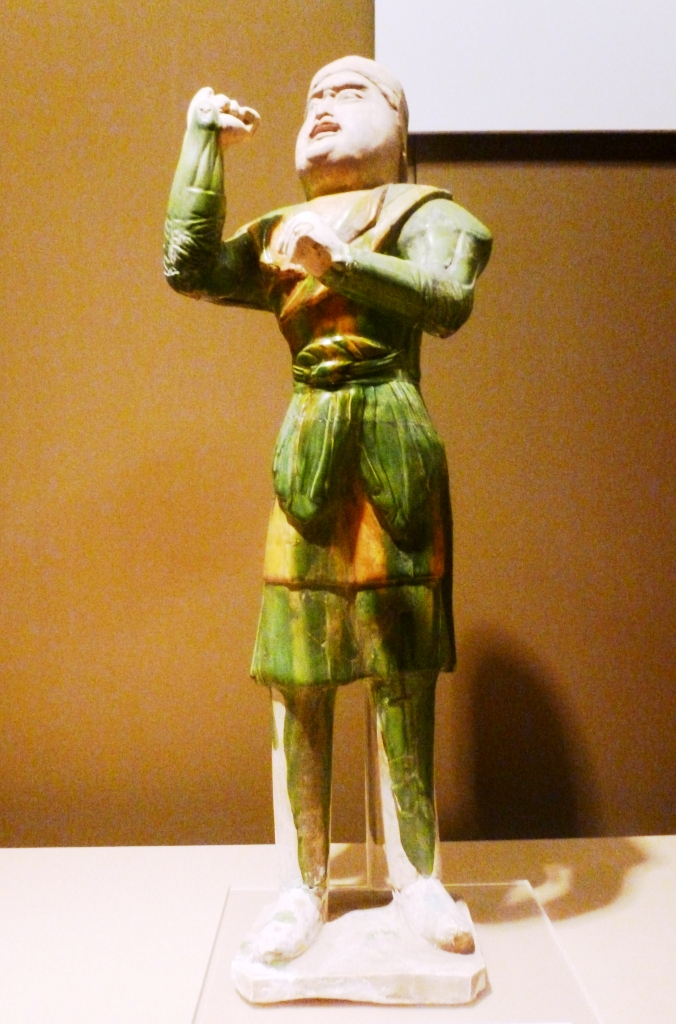
Tri-colored Kucha (Quici) figure. Tang dynasty

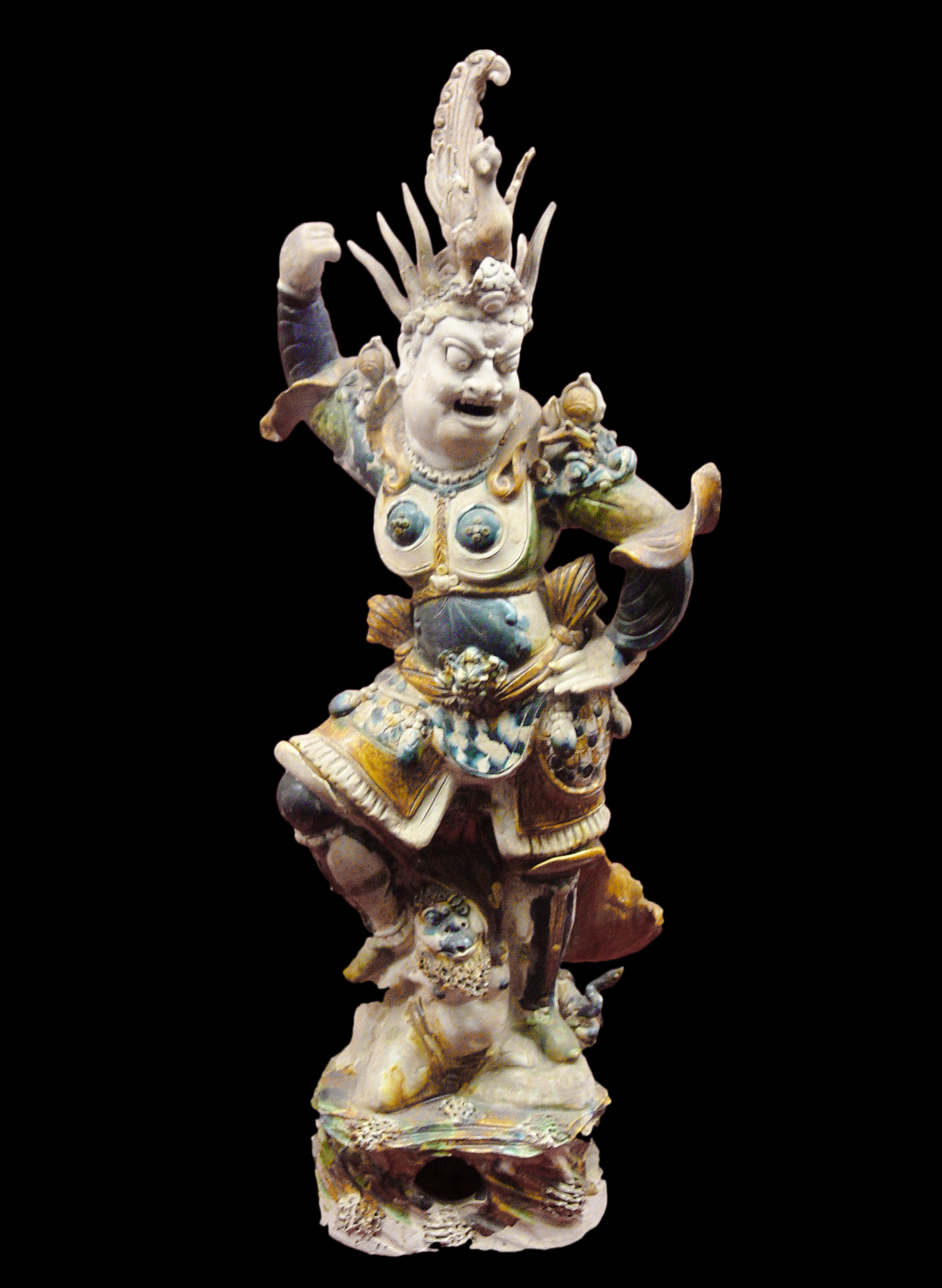
Tomb guardian with sancai glaze

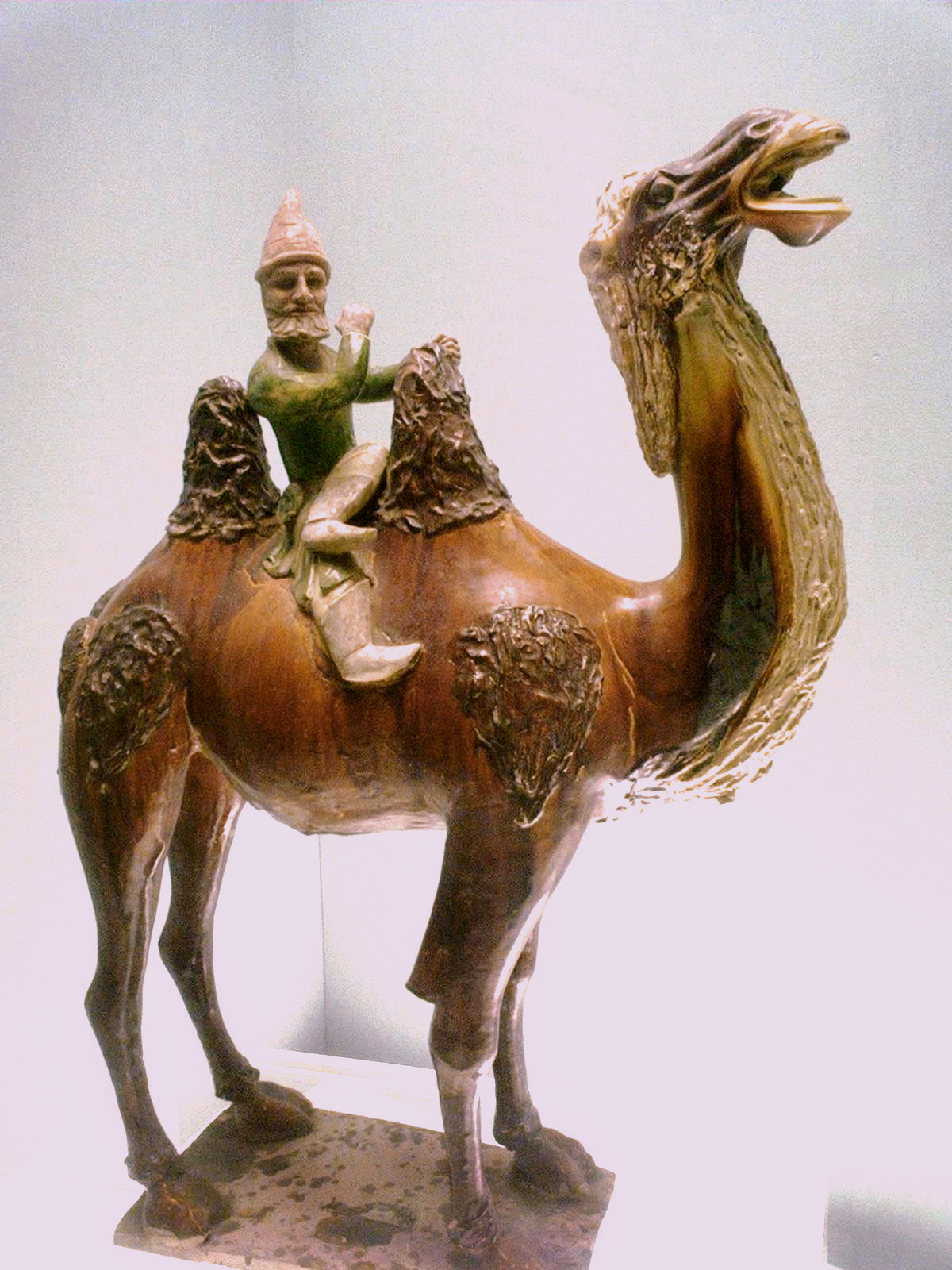
Sogdian on a camel, in sancai, Tang dynasty tomb figure

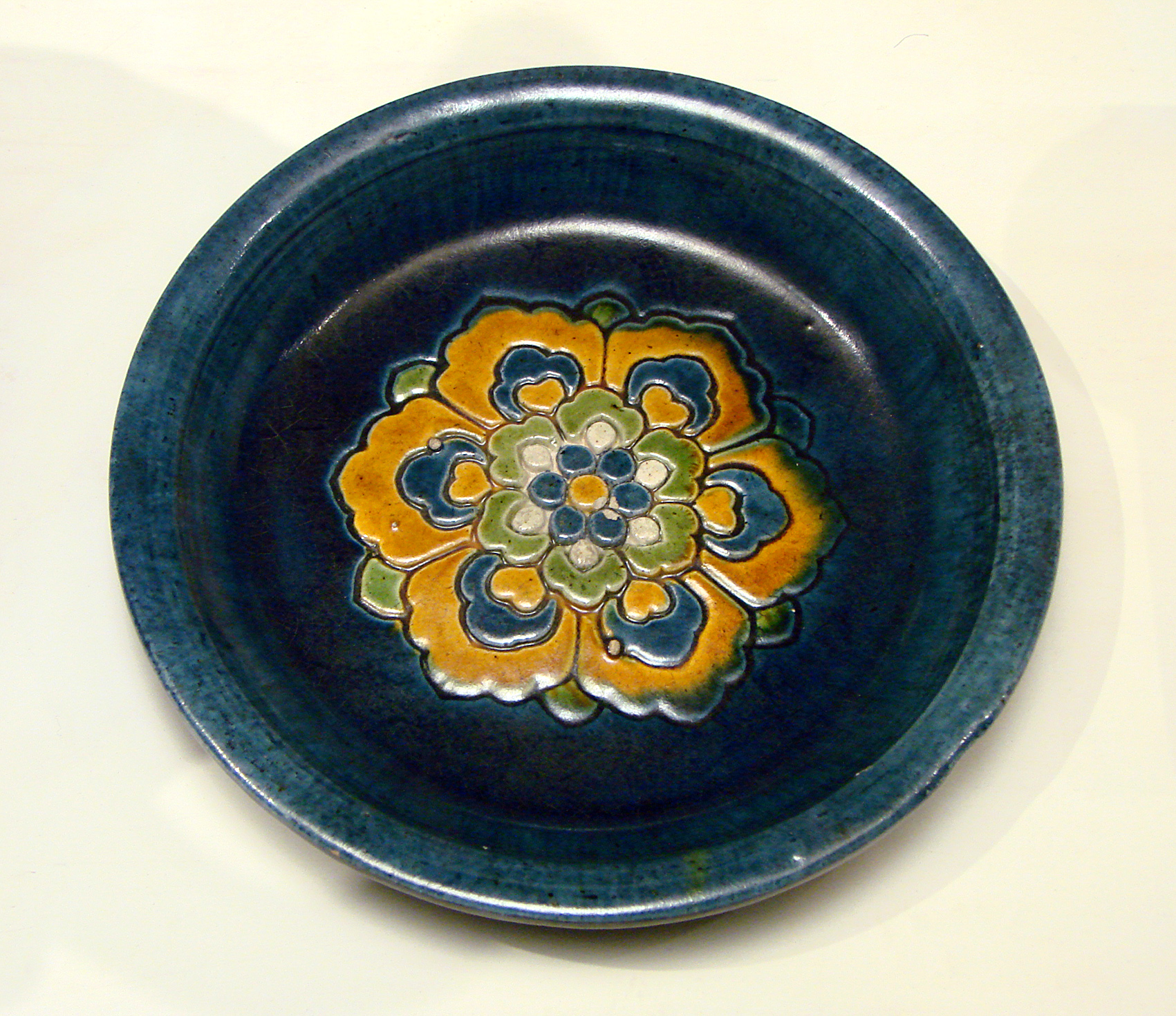
Tang offering tray, 8th-9th century, with cobalt blue the main colour

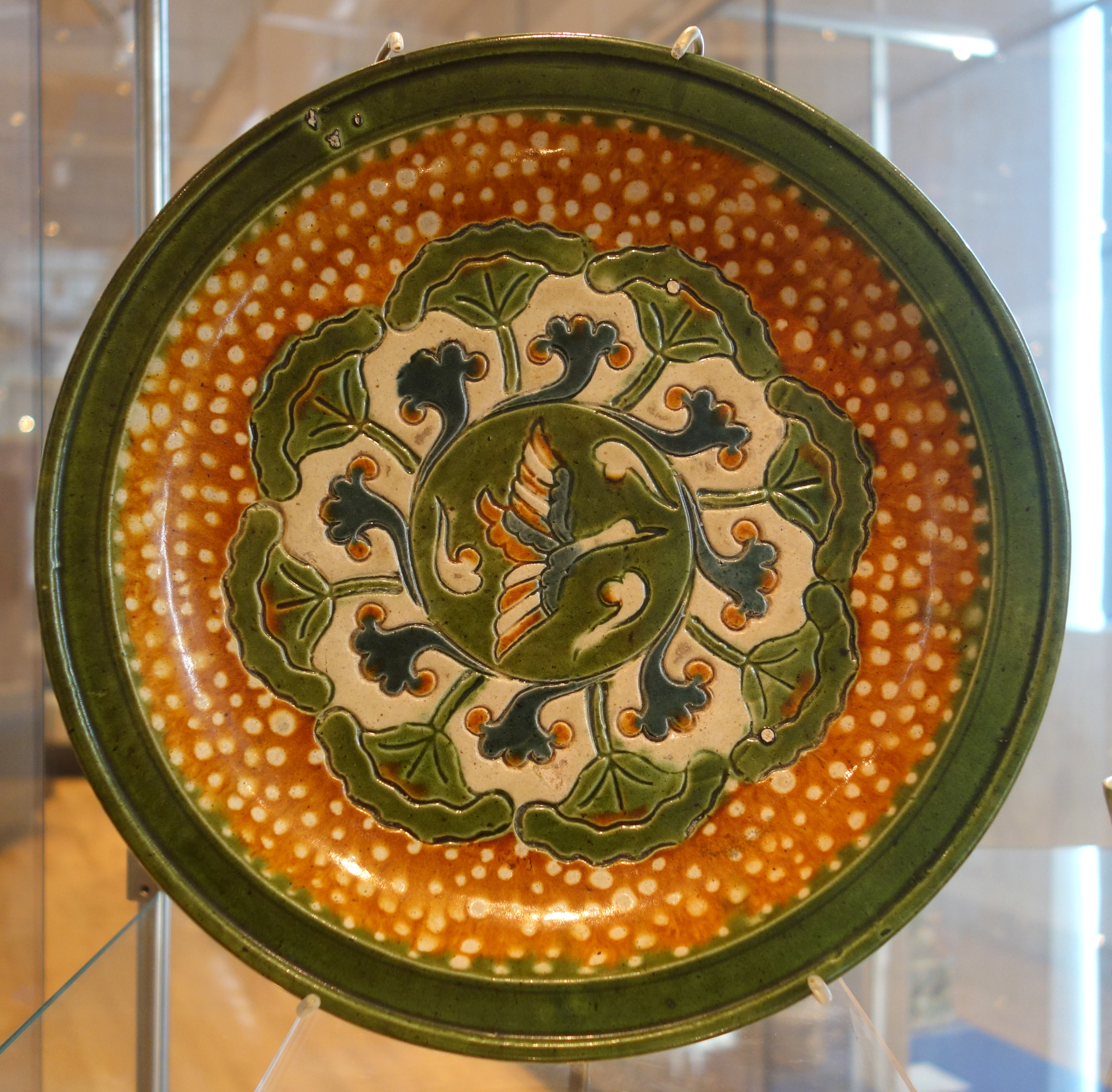
Tang offering tray, c. 675–750, with green the main colour

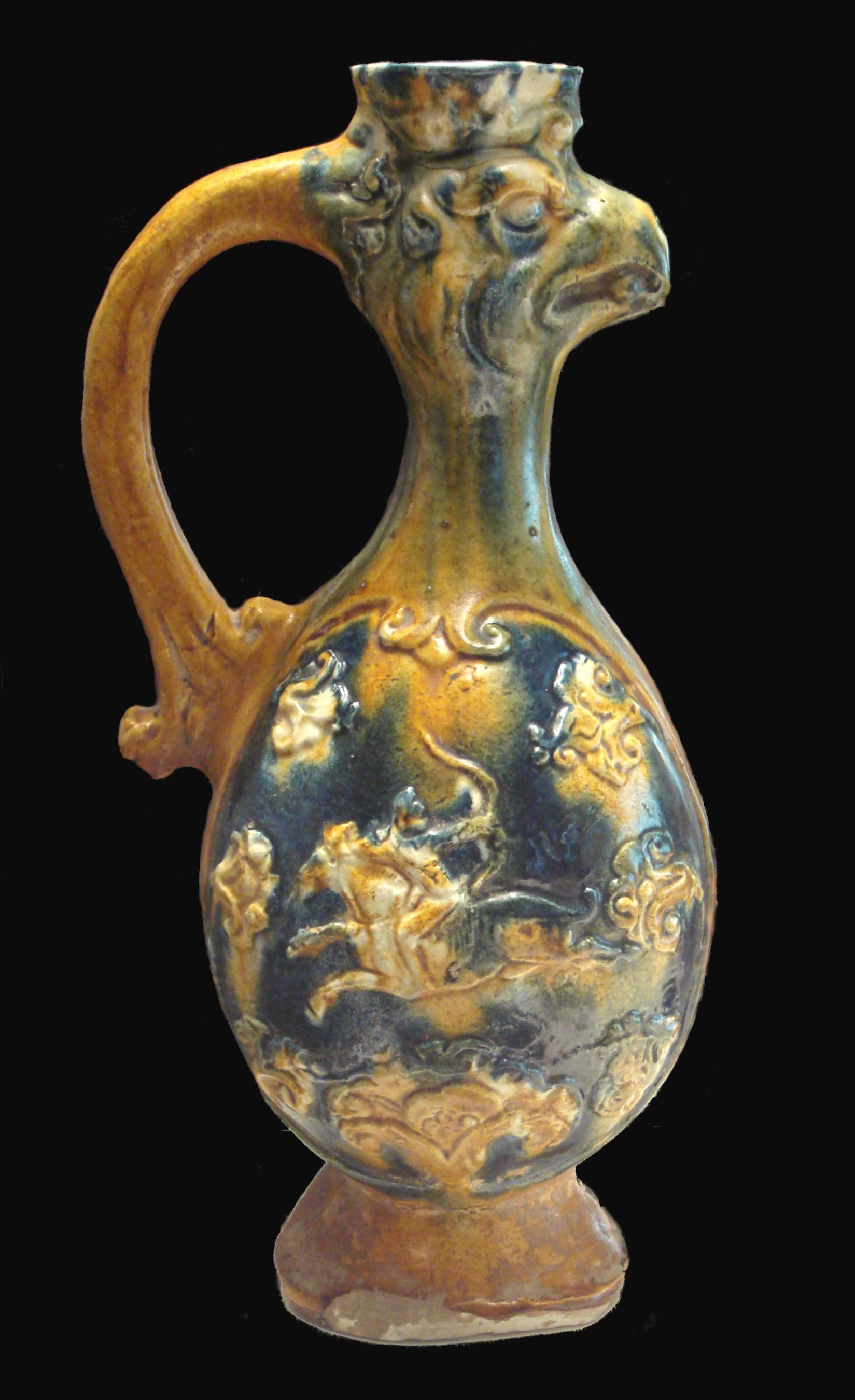
A Tang sancai ewer, mainly in blue, 8th-9th century

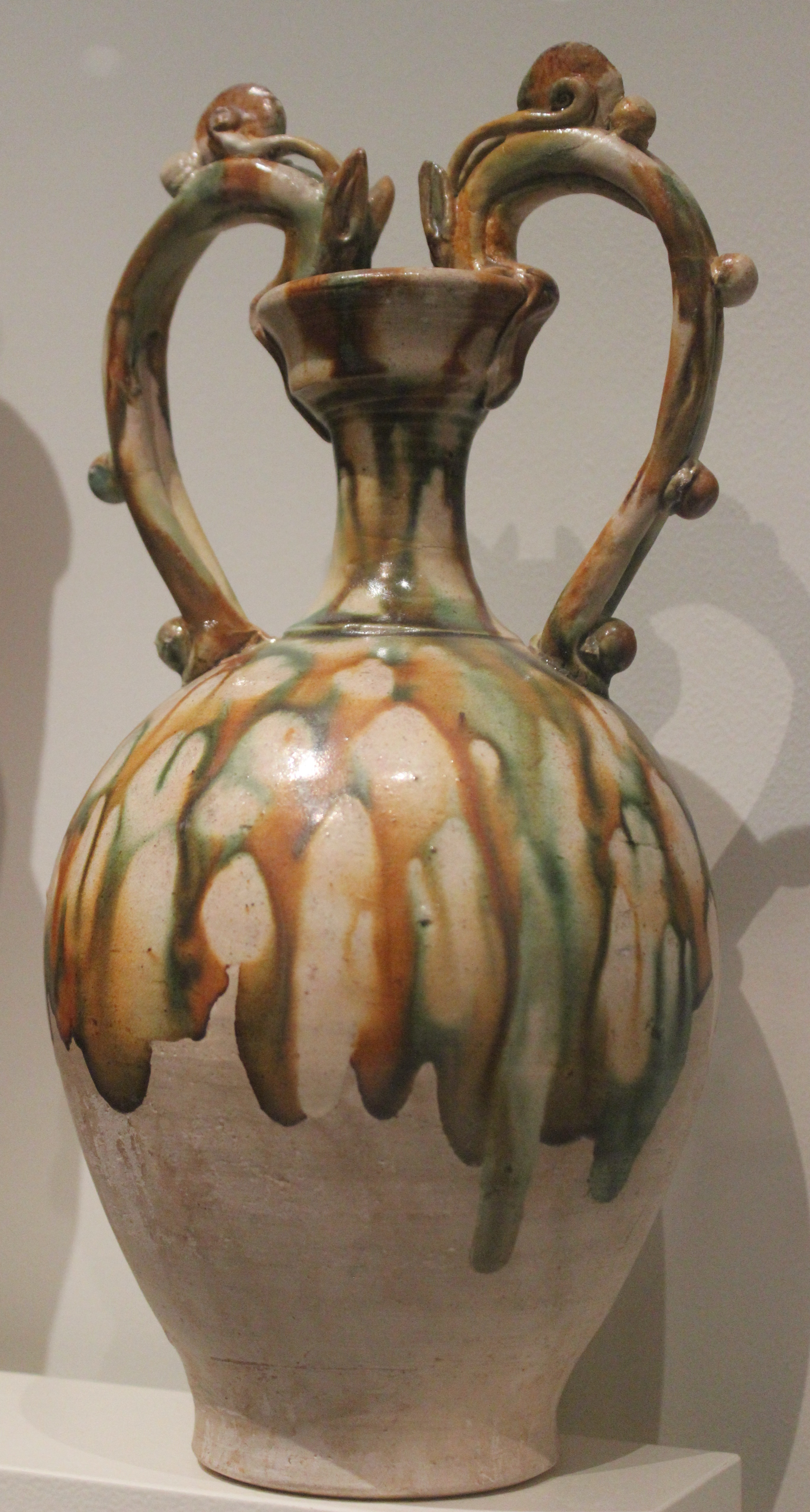
Splashed Tang amphora with dragon's head handles.

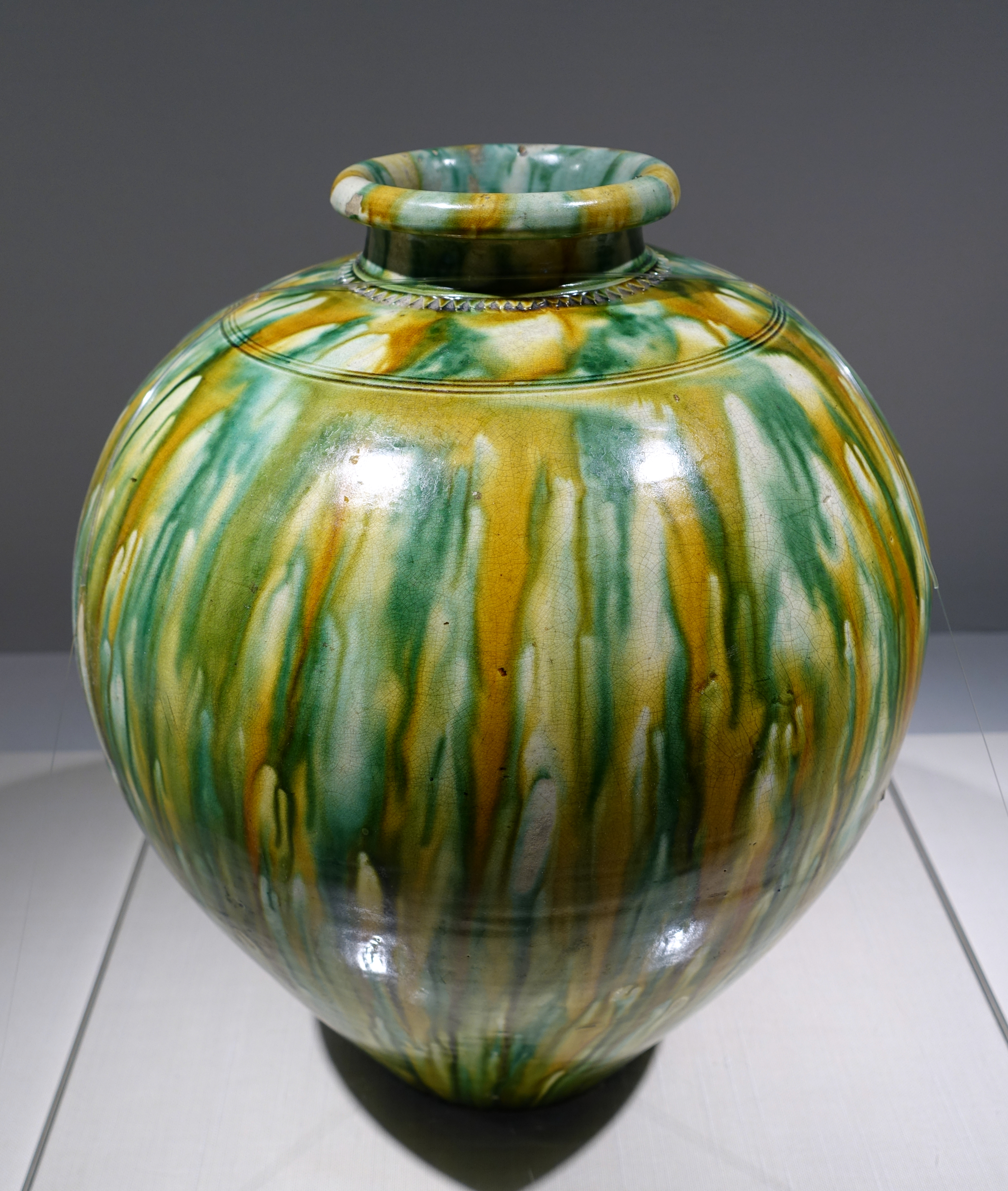
Large Tang jar

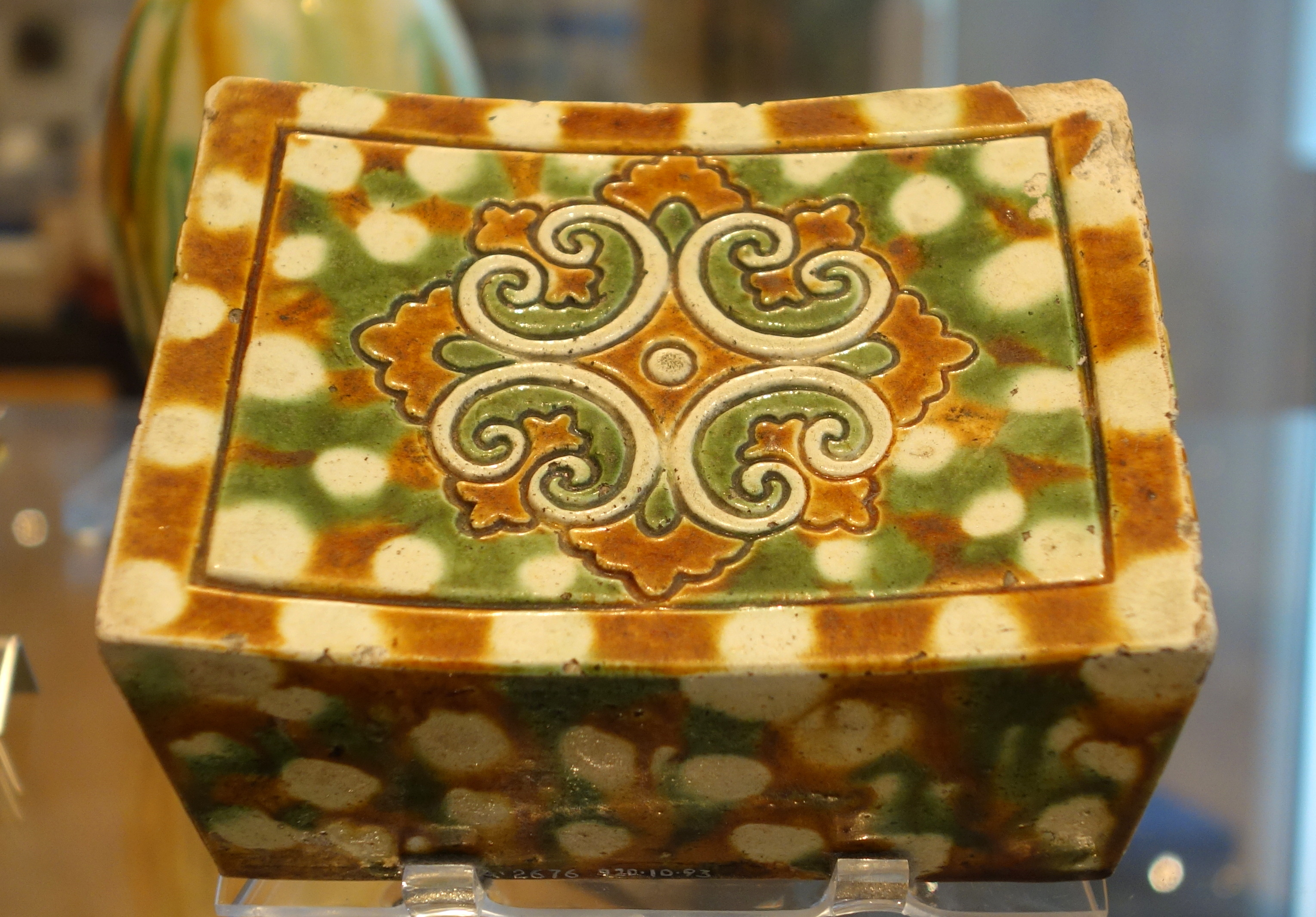
Tang ceramic pillow, c. 675-750

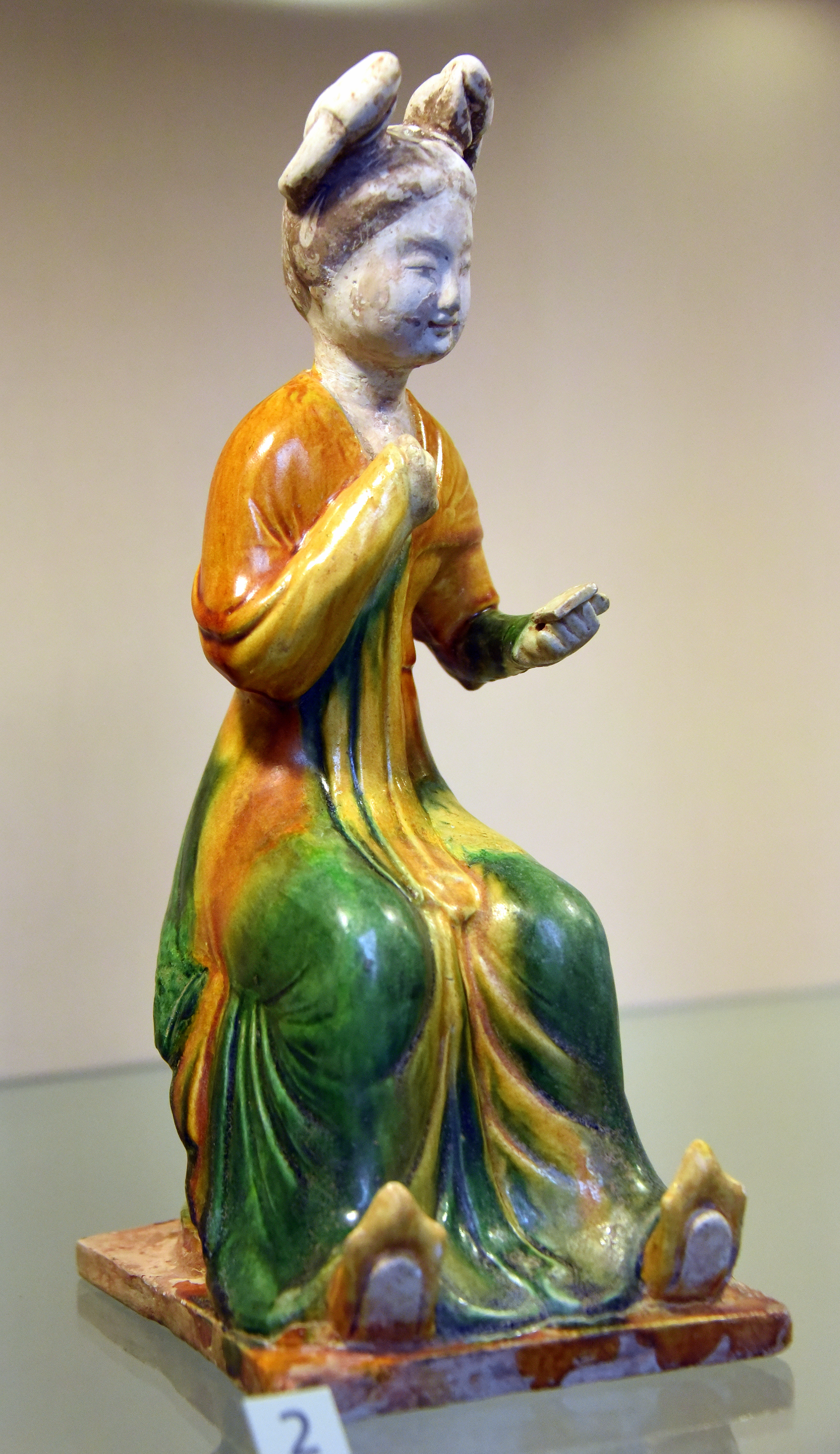
Woman holding a mirror. Earthenware with 3-colored (sancai) glaze. Tang dynasty, 700-750 CE. Victoria and Albert Museum, London.

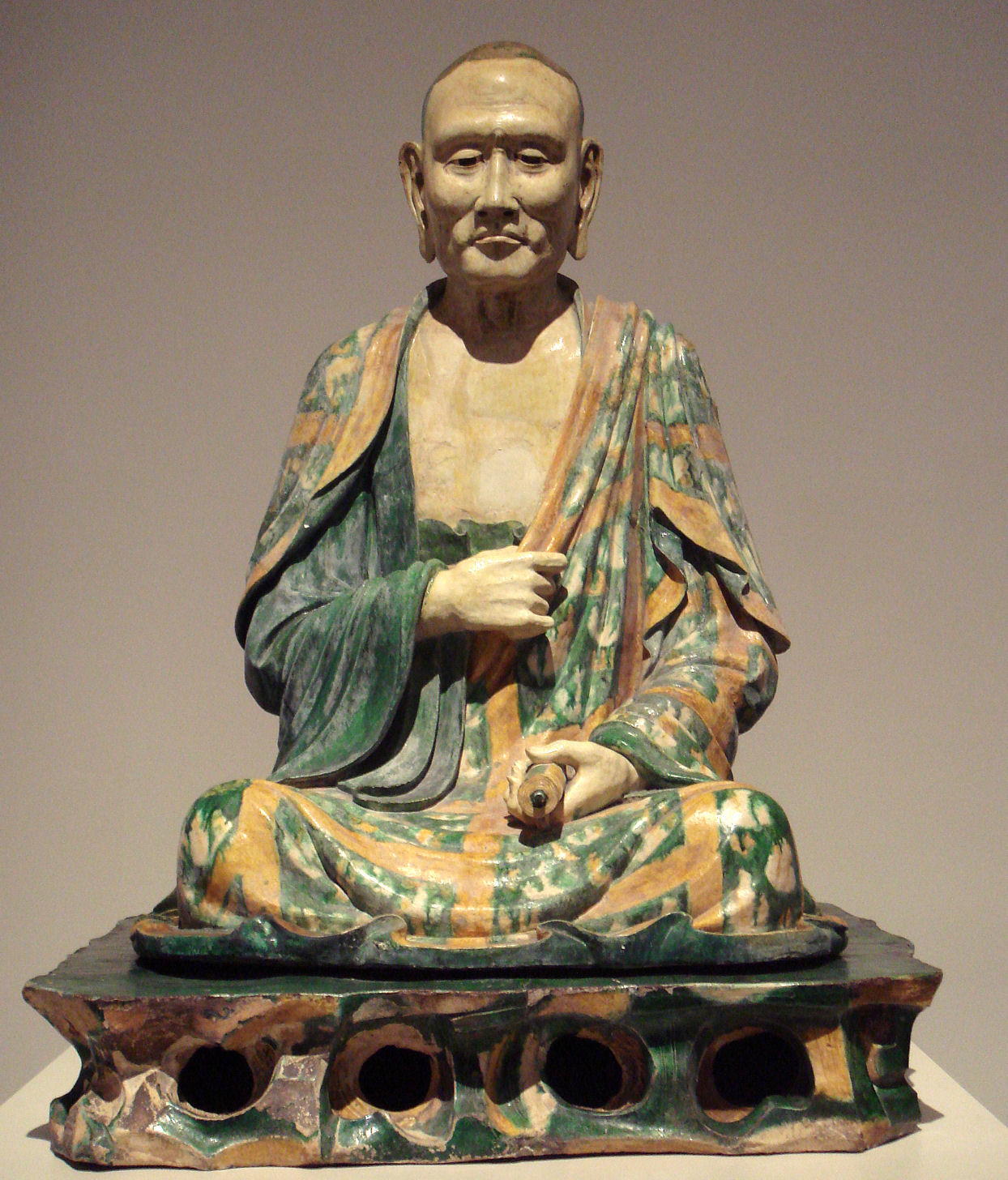
One of the Yixian glazed pottery luohans, c. 1200

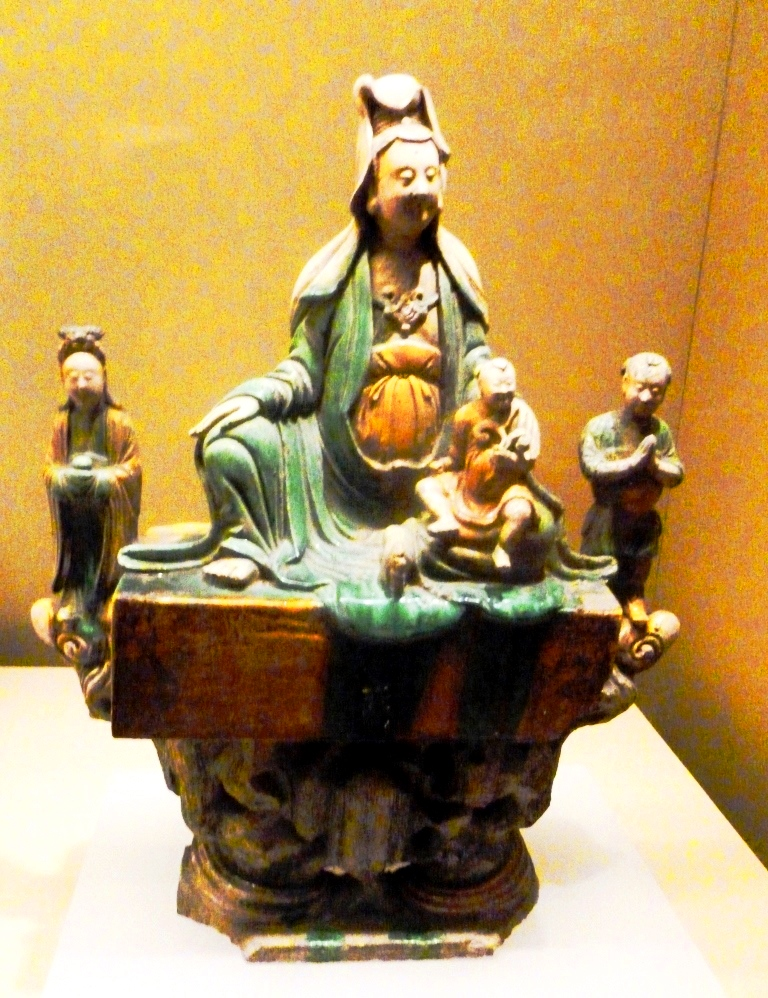
Tri-coloured Guan Yin (Avalokitesvara). Qing dynasty.

== Influences ==
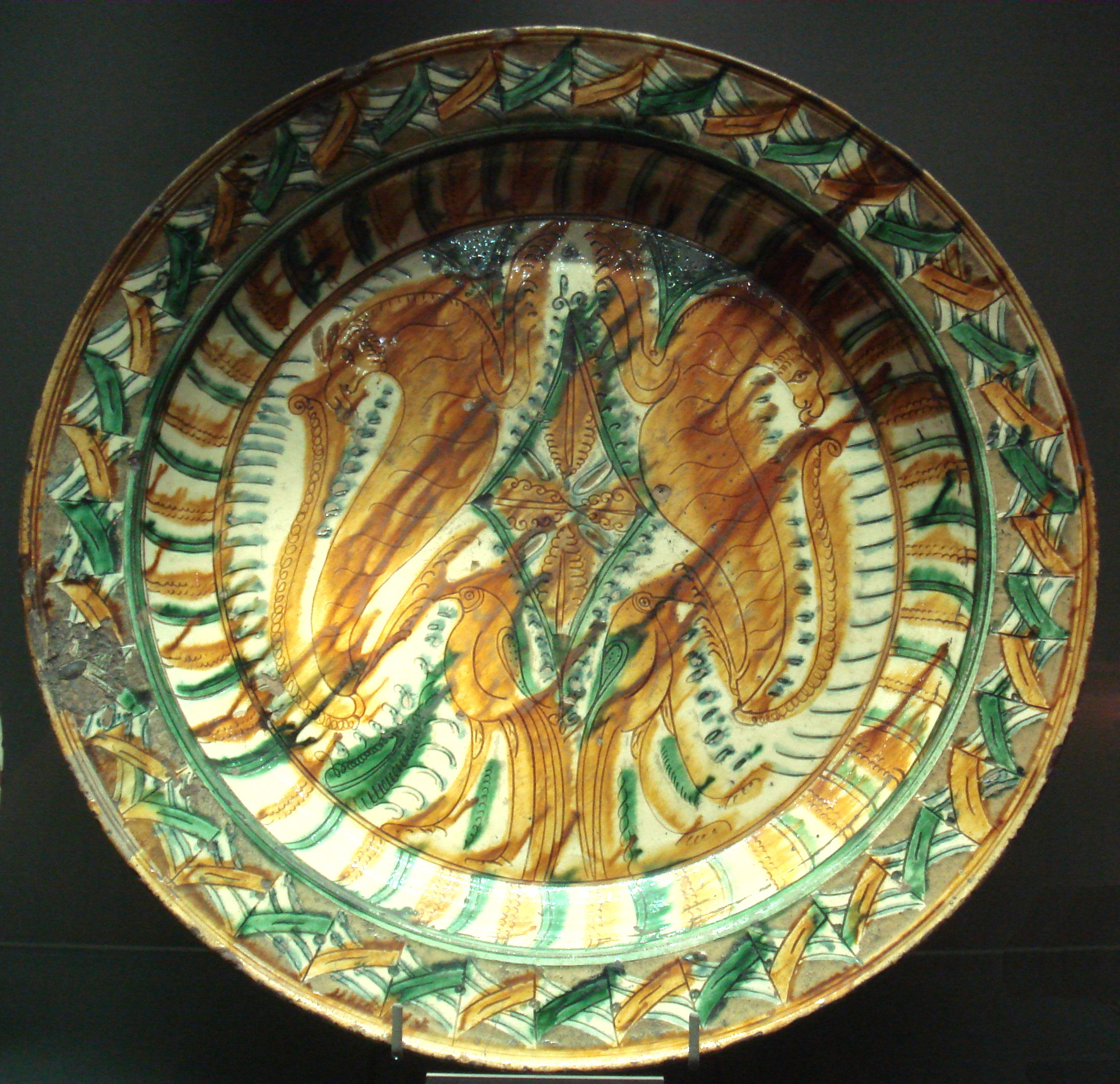
Italian pottery was, probably indirectly, influenced by Chinese ceramics; plate from Northern Italy, mid-15th century. Musée du Louvre.

Sancai travelled along the Silk Road, to be later extensively used in Syrian, Cypriot, and then Italian pottery from the 13th to the middle of the 15th century. Sancai also became a popular style in Japanese and other East Asian ceramic arts, such as Nagayo ware.

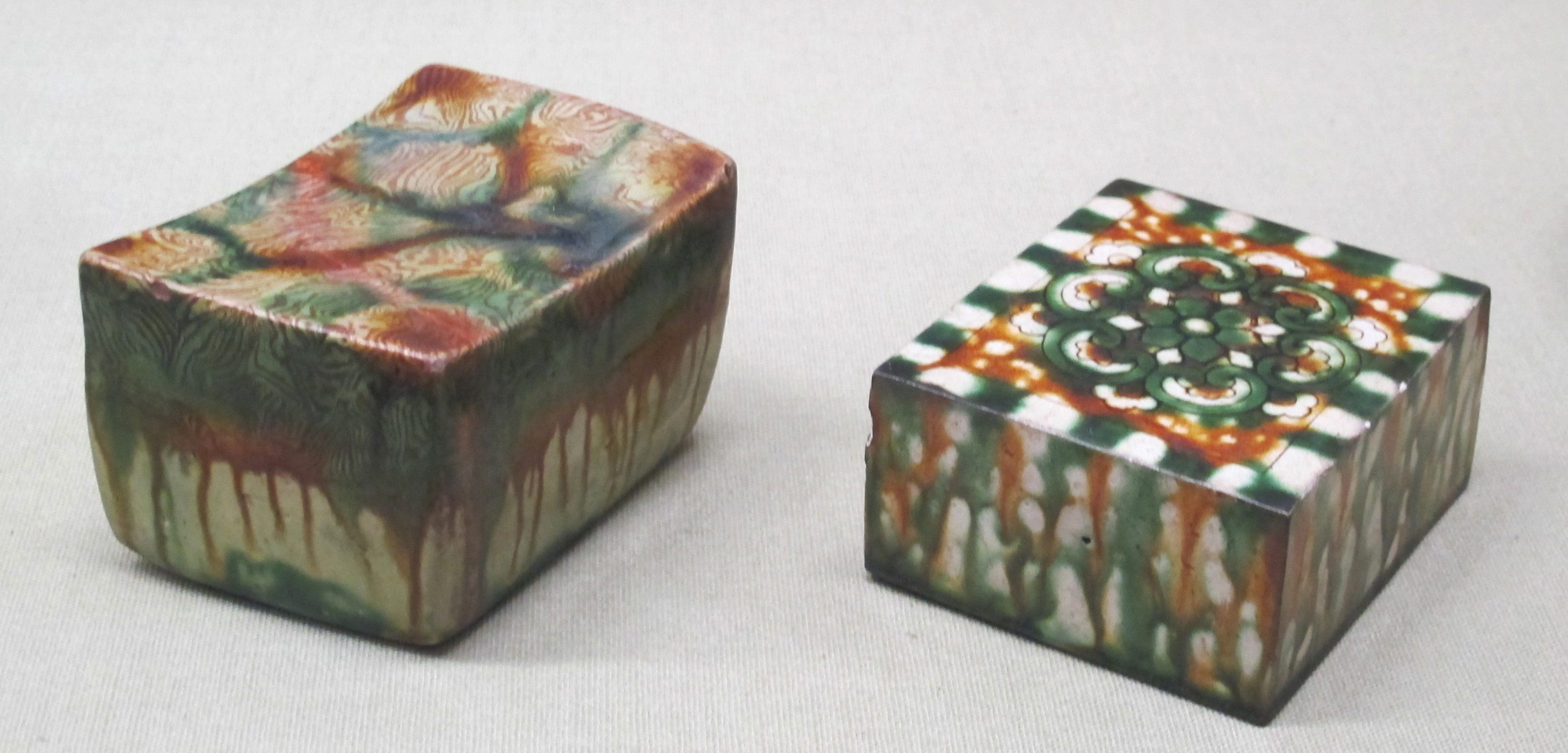
8th-century Japanese pillows

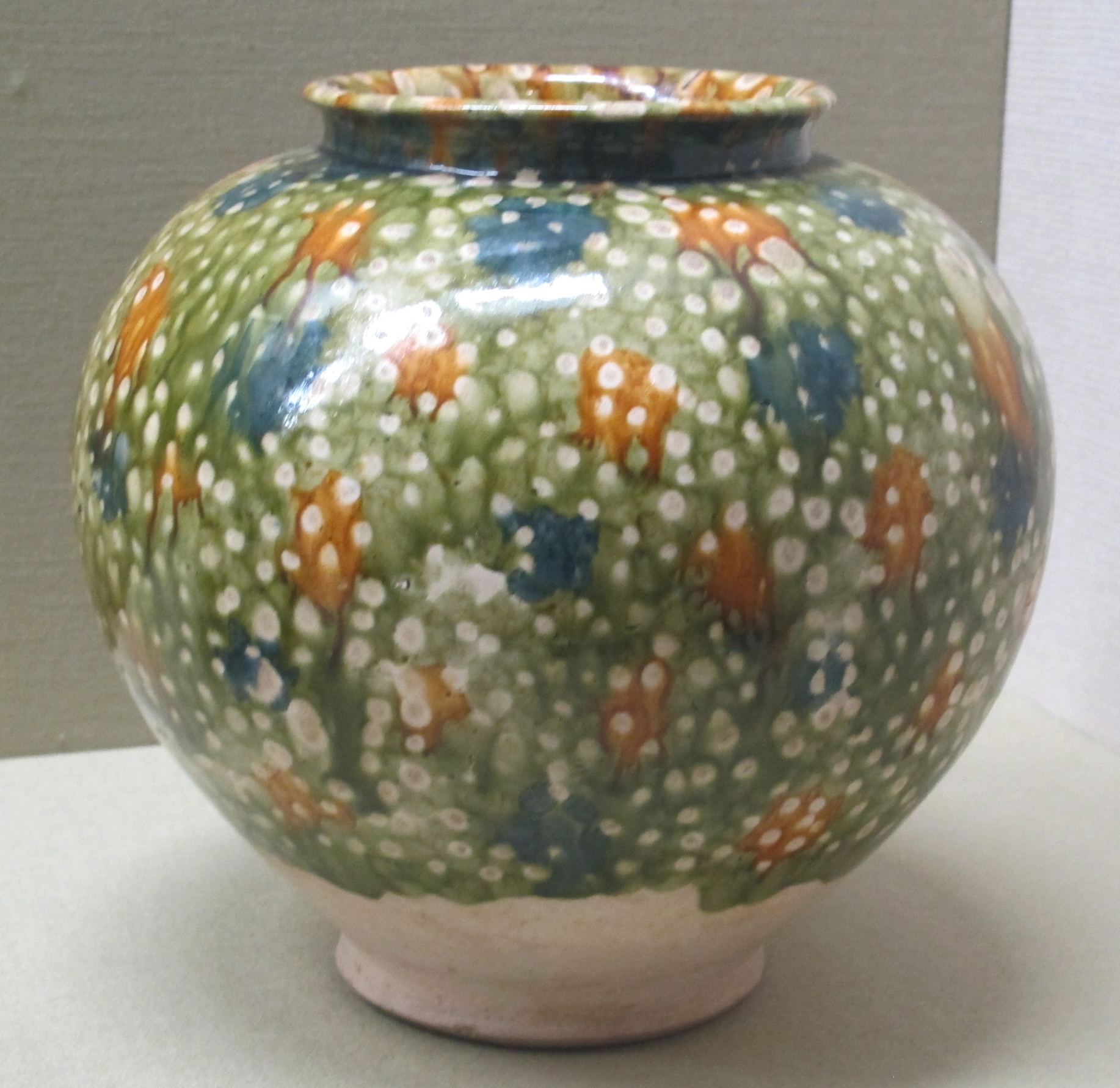
8th-century Japanese vase

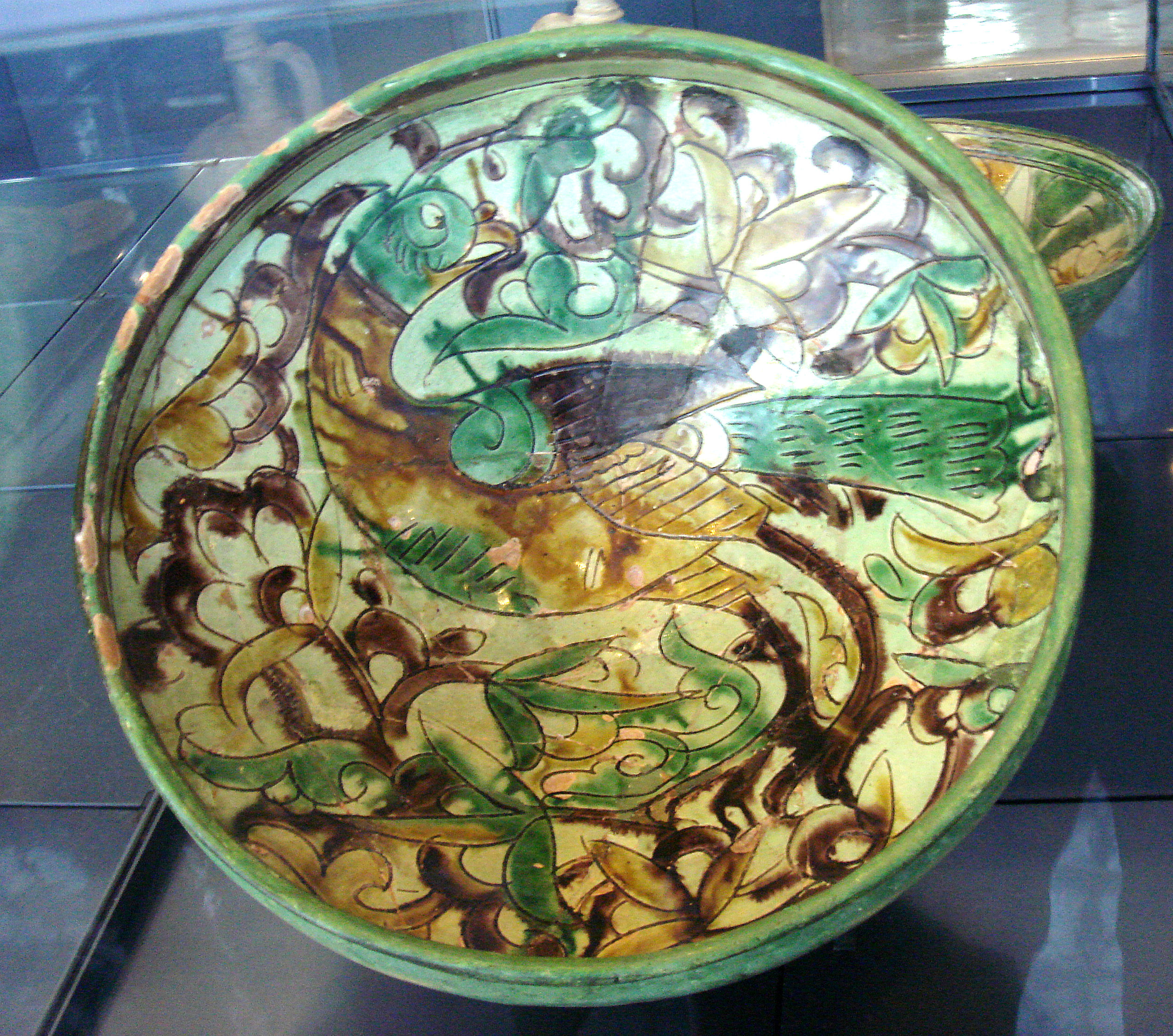
13th-century plate with bird, Syria

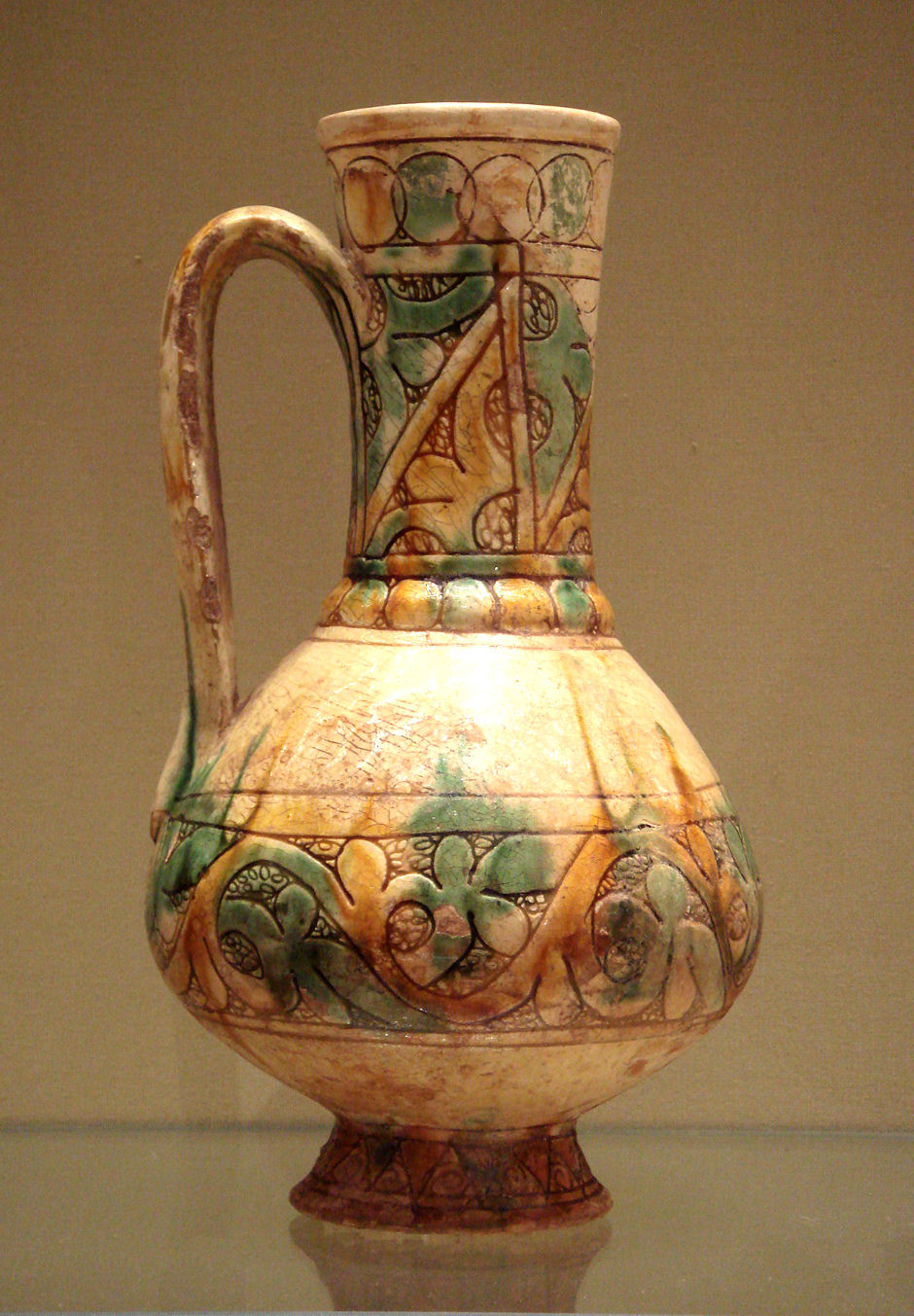
14th-century jug, Cyprus

== Revival under the Qing ==
Under the Qing dynasty (1644–1910), sancai wares were one of several earlier Chinese styles revived at a high quality level, reflecting the antiquarian tastes of the emperors. These pieces were made in Jingdezhen porcelain, with generally the sancai palette used in glazes to decorate contemporary shapes, often using bold splashes for a "dappled" effect. There was apparently no attempt to present them as very old – one piece below has a "spurious" reign mark, but one going back only the 15th century.

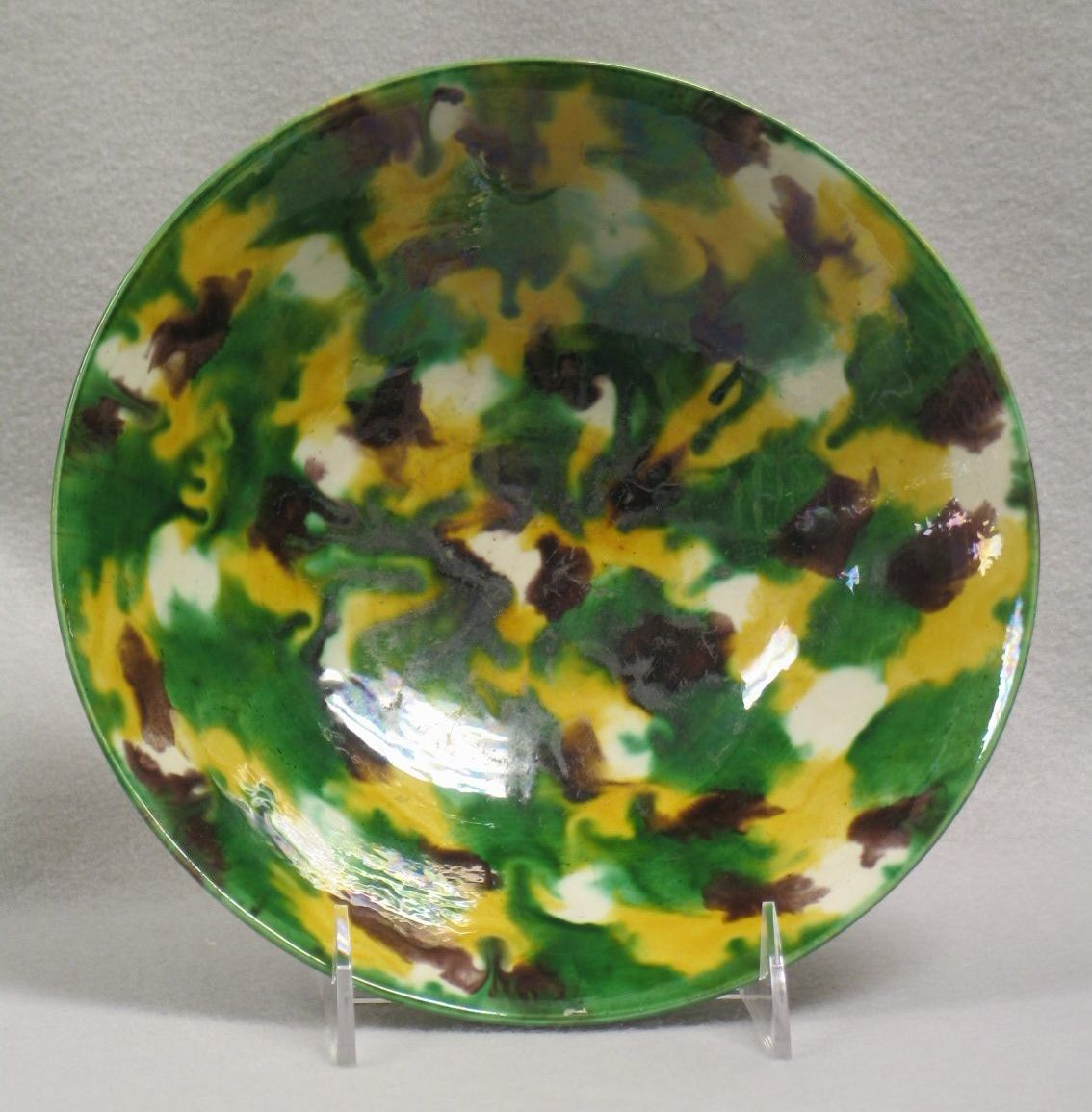
Bowl, Kangxi reign

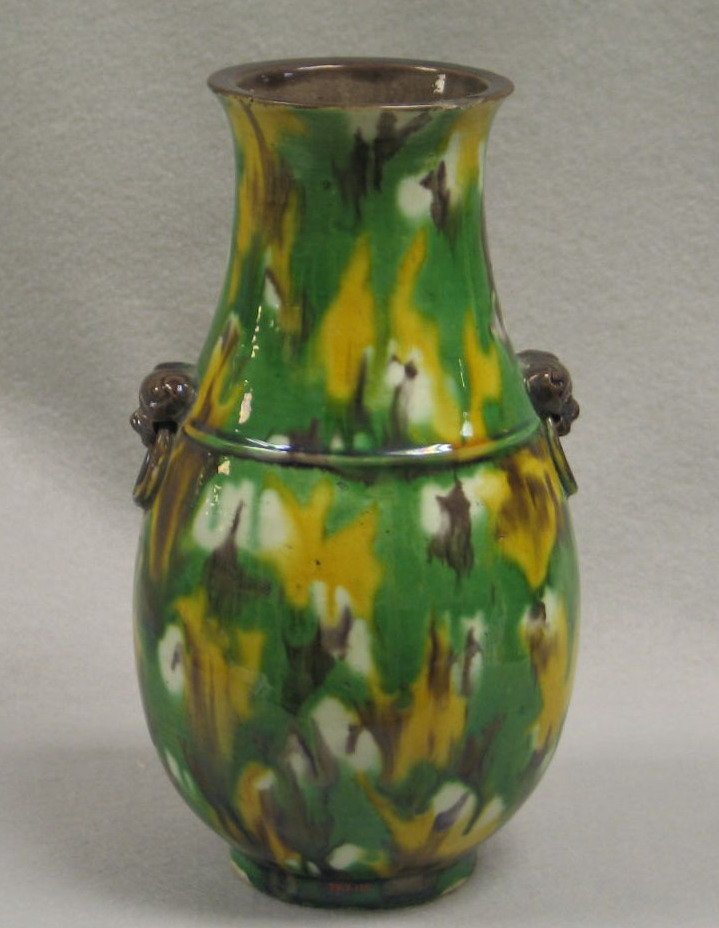
Vase, Kangxi reign

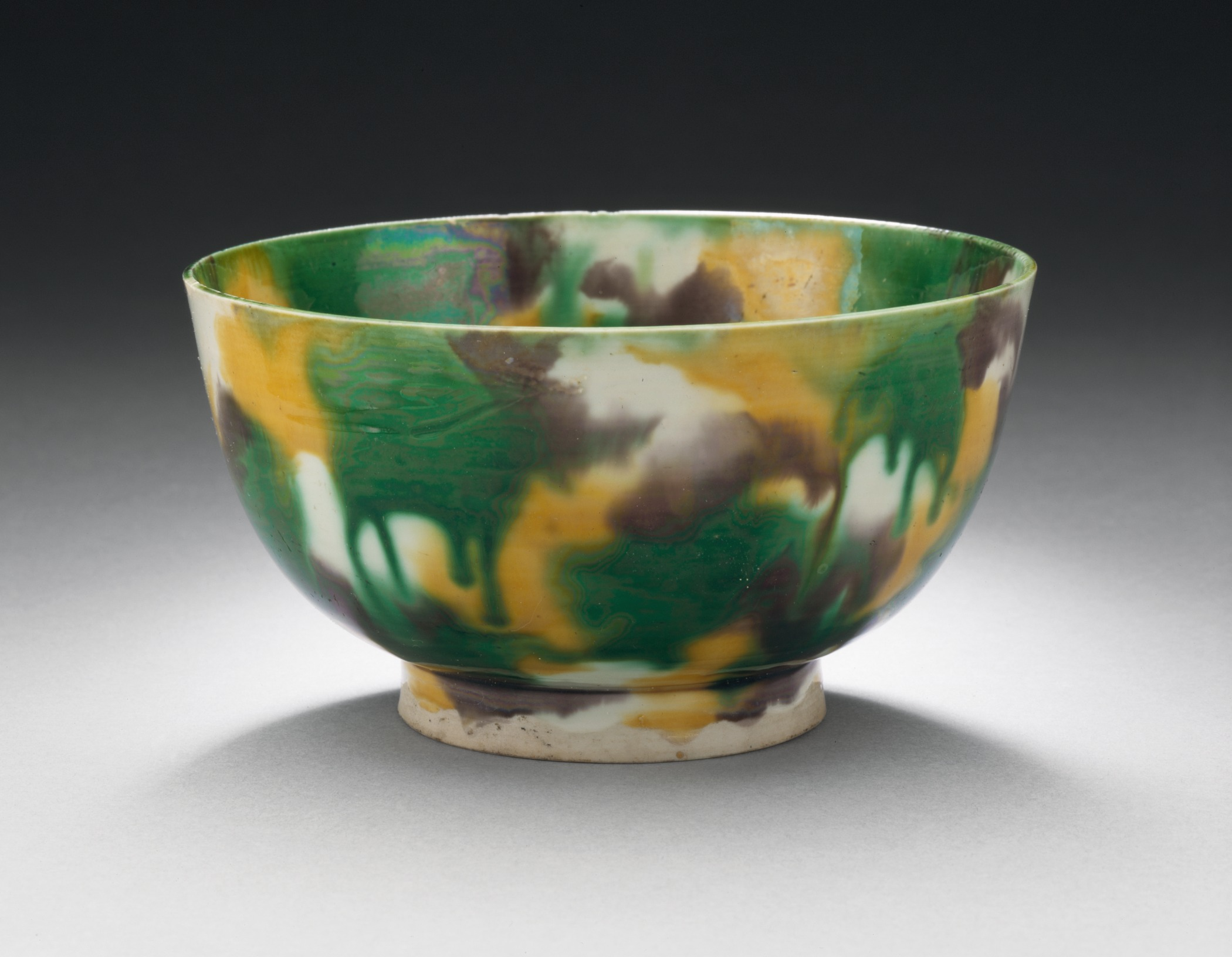
Kangxi period; here the colours are overglaze enamels rather than coloured glazes. This piece has the spurious reign mark of the Ming dynasty Chenghua Emperor, 1465-1487

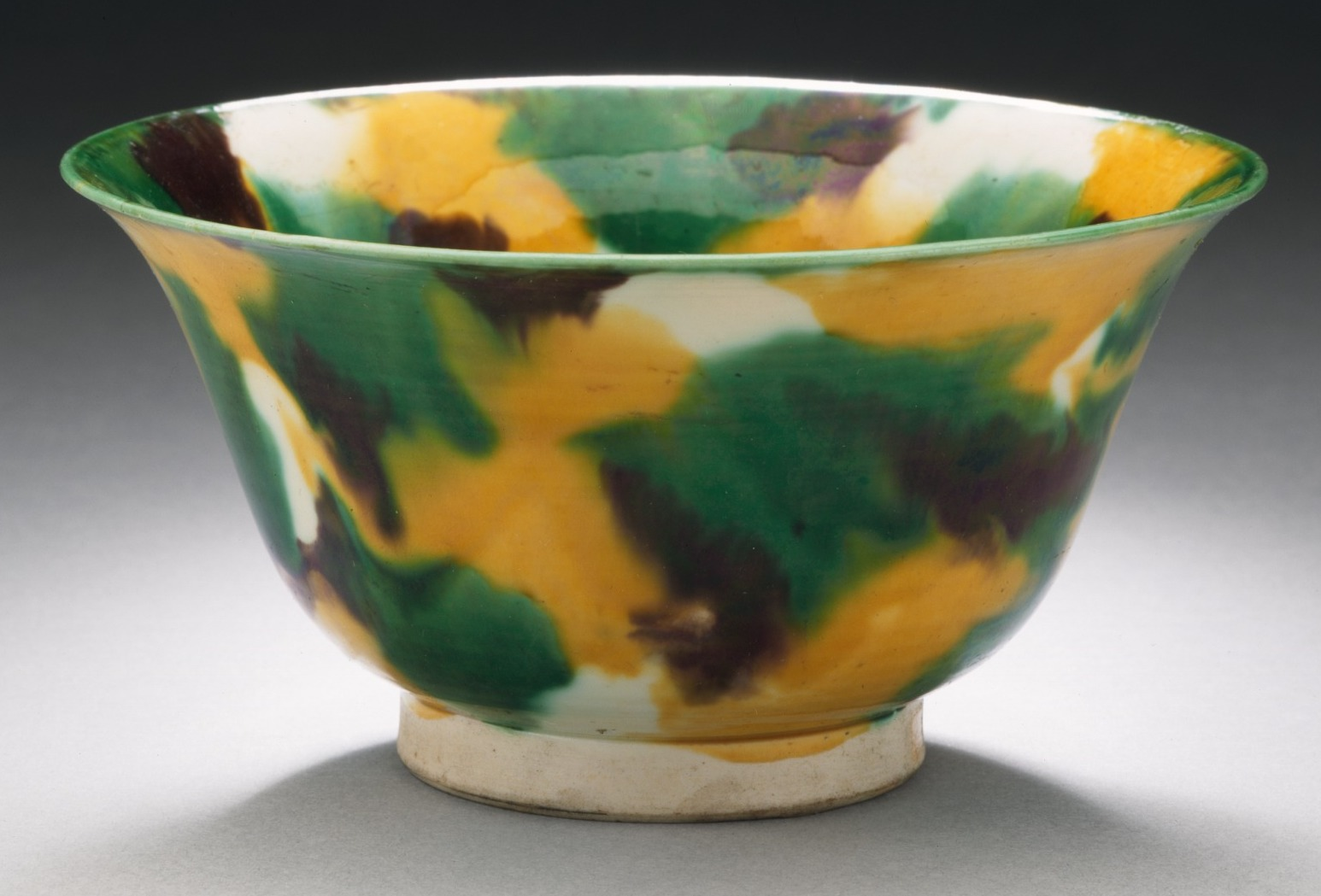
Kangxi period; here the colours are overglaze enamels rather than coloured glazes.

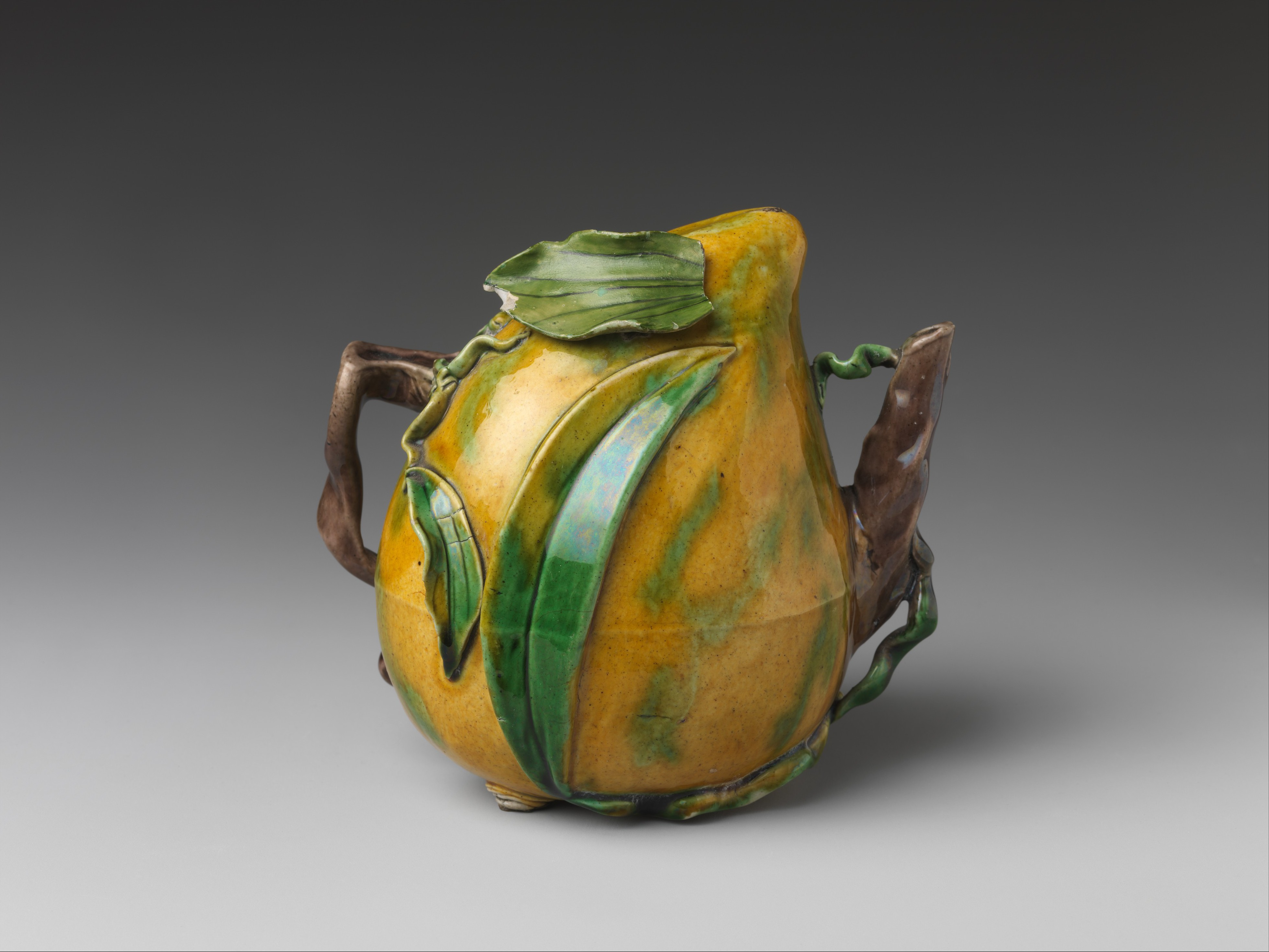
Peach-shaped pot for tea or wine, 18th or 19th century

== Modern reproduction trade ==
In the 1980s and early 1990s reproductions of Tang sancai pieces were sent by the Chinese government to foreign leaders as gifts, and became very popular within China. At one point there were more than 3,000 factories, mostly tiny and shabby, sprinkled around Luoyang City, cradle of the craft. They churned out shoddy Tang-style sancai pieces in vast numbers, until they began to undercut each other in a chaotic price war. With a glut in the market, many of their products ended up being hawked by street vendors.

The reproduction business has benefited from the development of new techniques. Some in the field can produce works that may fool even the most experienced eyes. Emboldened by the precision of forgery technology and lured by exorbitant profit, some sell pastiches as originals.
