= Green-glazed pottery =

Type of colored pottery developed in China during the Eastern Han period (25–220 CE)

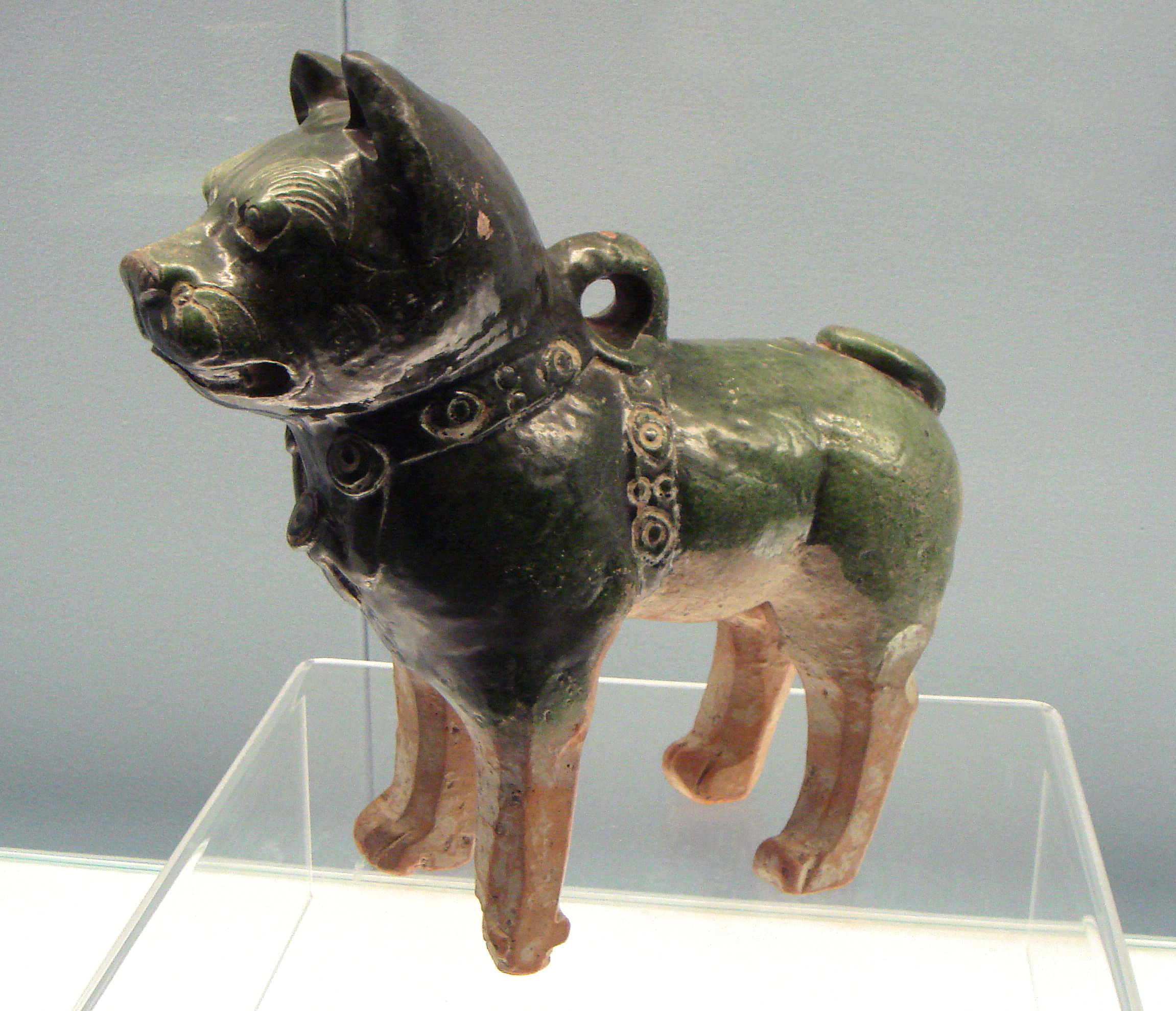
Green-glazed pottery dog, Eastern Han, 25–220 CE

Green-glazed pottery (Chinese: 緑釉陶器) was a type of colored pottery developed in China during the Eastern Han period (25–220 CE). The body of green-glazed pottery ceramics was made of clay, coated with a layer of glaze, and fired at a temperature of 800 degrees Celsius. Green-glazed pottery is a type of lead-glazed earthenware (Chinese: 鉛釉陶器): lead oxide was the principal flux in the glaze, often mixed with quartz in the proportion of 3:1. The polychrome effect was obtained by using as coloring agent copper (which turns green).

Due to the low firing temperature, the bodies are earthenware, and the glaze often only applied to parts of the objects, which are fragile and have high water absorption. In some cases the lead glazes make the objects slightly poisonous. For these reasons, the objects are only known as grave goods from burials, and examples used in everyday life have not been found. In surviving examples the glaze has often corroded, and turned a "greyish-silver". They are liable to flake off.

Green-glazed pottery was to be followed by Sancai polychrome glazes, generally including the same green, from the 7th century during the Tang period. Examples of green-glazed pottery have also been found in Parthian ceramics.
