= Iznik pottery =

Type of decorated ceramic

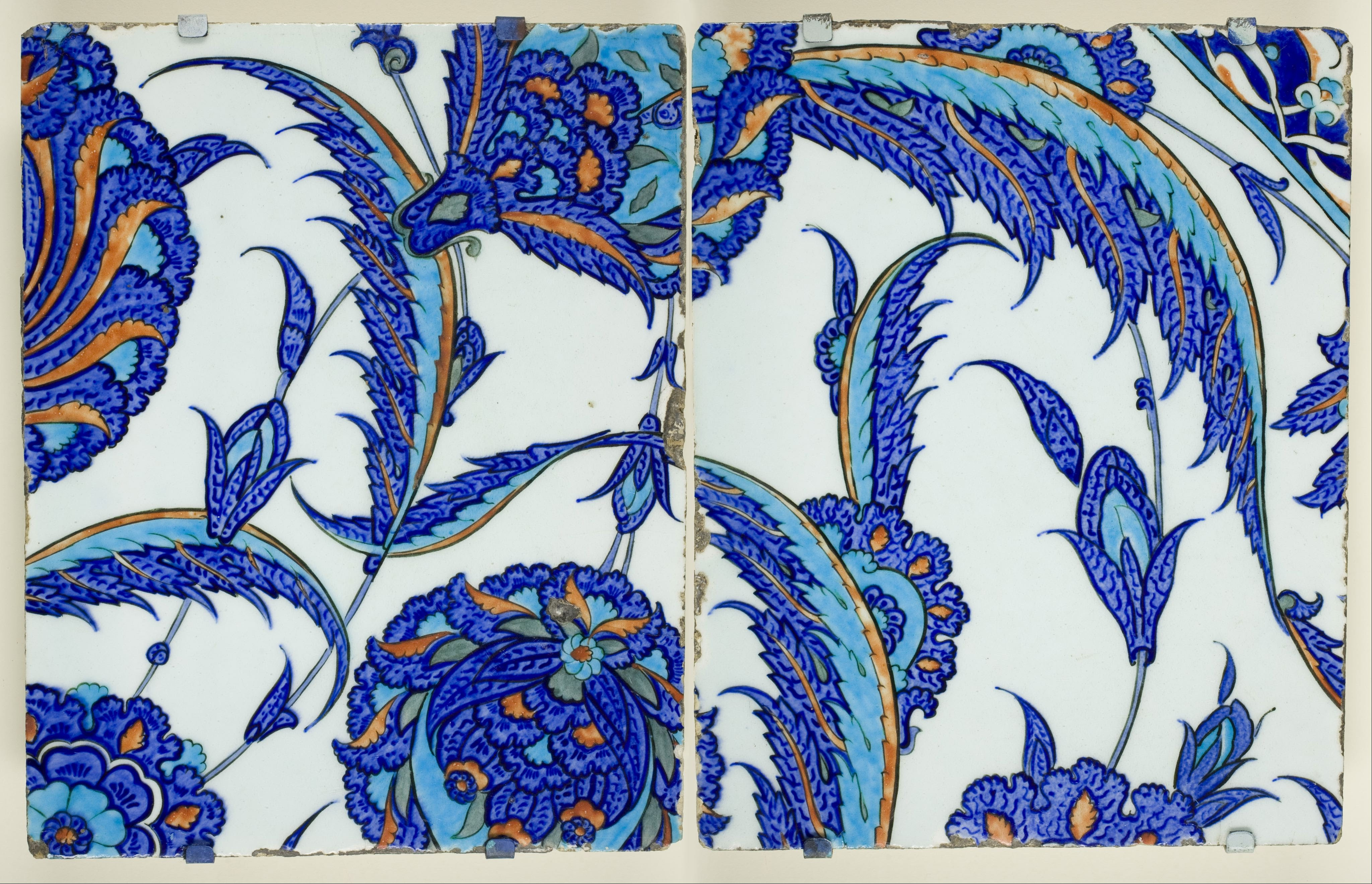
Two tiles, circa 1560, fritware, painted in blue, turquoise, red, green, and black under a transparent glaze, Art Institute of Chicago (Chicago, US)

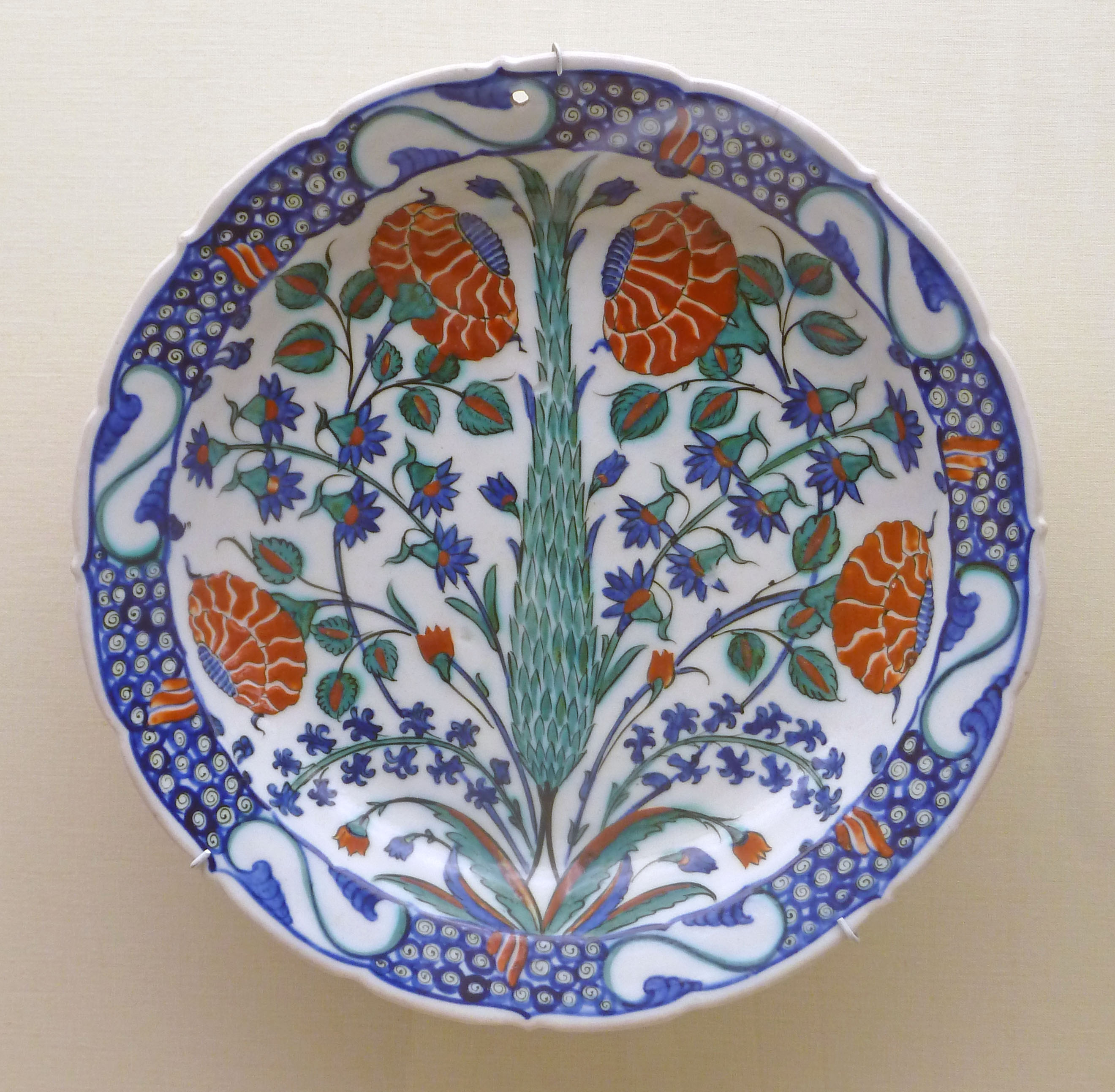
Dish with foliate rim decorated with flowers and a cypress tree, with a dollar pattern border, c. 1575

Iznik pottery, or Iznik ware, named after the town of İznik in Anatolia where it was made, is a decorated ceramic that was produced from the last quarter of the 15th century until the end of the 17th century. The Ottoman Turkish motivation for creating İznik ware was to imitate the prestige and symbolic value of Chinese porcelain, not its specific decorative designs. While their conceptual origin lies in Chinese blue-and-white porcelain, their decorative design is a distinct Ottoman adaptation of the International Timurid style. This adaptation is marked by a transformation from the prototype's languid quality to a more forceful and contained design, distinguished by its intensity and three-dimensional feel. Technologically, these wares are unique, differing from the methods used for contemporary Iranian pottery and Ottoman architectural tilework. This distinct manufacturing process is thought to be an invention of Anatolian potters.

İznik was an established centre for the production of simple earthenware pottery with an underglaze decoration when, in the last quarter of the 15th century, craftsmen in the town began to manufacture high quality pottery with a fritware body painted with cobalt blue under a colourless transparent lead glaze. The change was almost certainly a result of active intervention and patronage by the recently established Ottoman court in Istanbul who greatly valued Chinese blue-and-white porcelain.

During the 16th century the decoration of the pottery gradually changed in style, becoming looser and more flowing. Additional colours were introduced. Initially turquoise was combined with the dark shade of cobalt blue and then the shades of piney green and pale purple were added. From the middle of the century the potters in Iznik produced large quantities of underglazed tiles to decorate the imperial buildings designed by the architect Mimar Sinan. Associated with the production of tiles was the introduction of a very characteristic bole red to replace the purple and a bright emerald green to replace the sage green. From the last decade of the century there was a marked deterioration in quality and although production continued during the 17th century the designs were poor. The last important building to be decorated with tiles from Iznik was the Sultan Ahmed Mosque (Blue Mosque) in Istanbul that was completed in 1616.

The ceramic collection of the Topkapı Palace includes over ten thousand pieces of Chinese porcelain but almost no Iznik pottery. Most of the surviving Iznik vessels are in museums outside Turkey, but examples of the city's tile production exist in numerous cities throughout Turkey, such as Istanbul, Bursa, Edirne and Adana. In Istanbul examples of Iznik tiling can be seen in mosques, tombs, libraries, and palace buildings, such as the Rüstem Pasha Mosque, the Sokollu Mehmet Pasha Mosque, the tomb of Selim II in the Hagia Sophia complex, and certain buildings of the Topkapı Palace complex such as the Circumcision room and the Baghdad Kiosk.

== Overview: role of Chinese porcelain ==
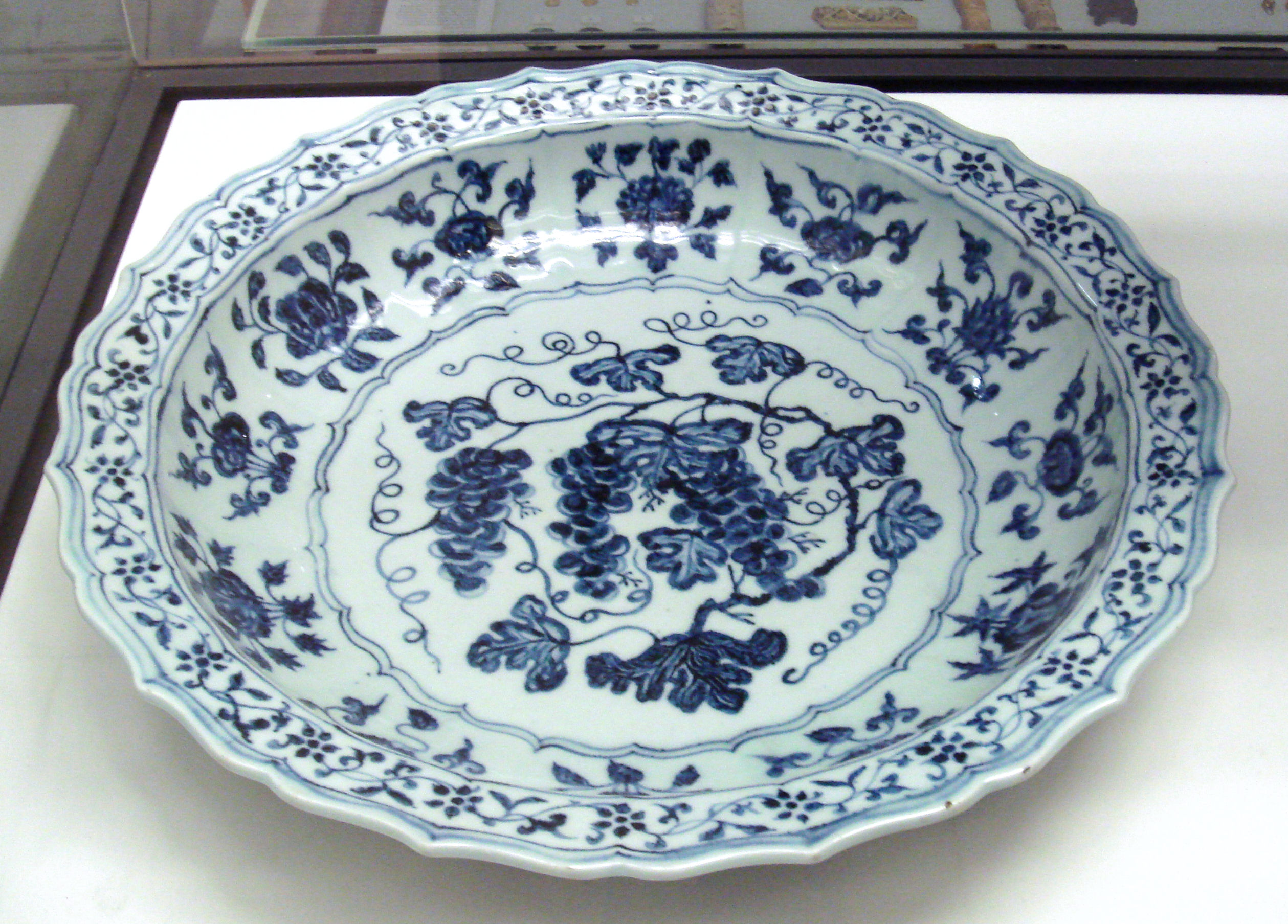
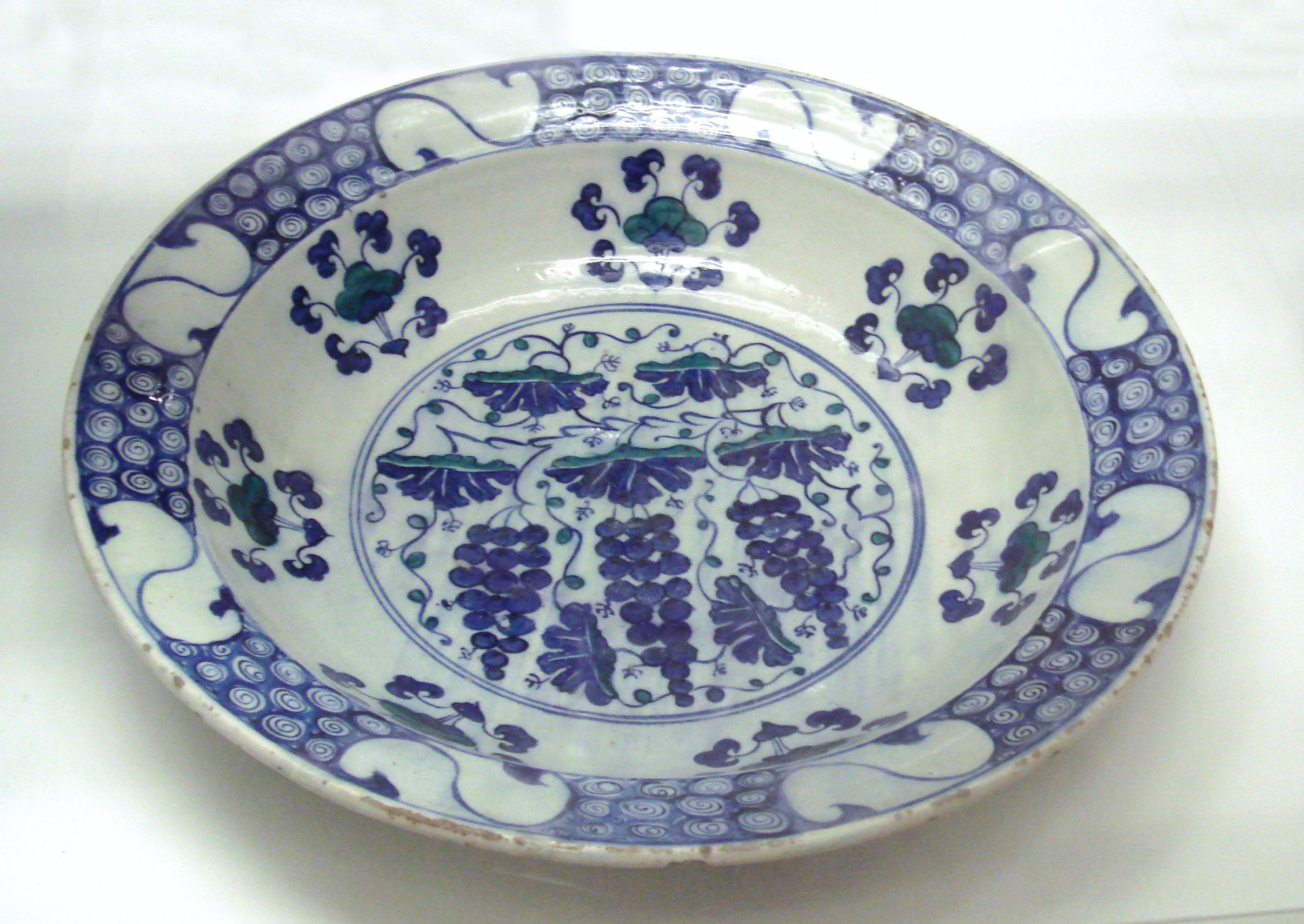
Left: Ming dynasty porcelain dish with grape design, Jingdezhen, China, 1403–1424.
Right: Fritware dish with grape design, İznik, Turkey, 1550–1570.

In earlier periods, Chinese craftspeople used blue-and-white porcelain to replicate the styles of Islamic pottery and metal crafts. Chinese potters in the eighth century duplicated designs like lotus scrolls and motifs from Persian silverwork.

Following the establishment of the Ottoman Empire in the early 14th century, Iznik pottery initially followed Seljuk Empire antecedents.

After this initial period, Iznik vessels were inspired by Chinese porcelain, which was highly prized by the Ottoman sultans. As the potters were unable to make porcelain, the vessels produced were fritware, a low-fired body comprising mainly silica and glass. The Ottoman Turkish motivation for creating İznik ware was to imitate the prestige and symbolic value of Chinese porcelain, not its specific decorative designs. The originality of the potters was such that their use of Chinese originals has been described as adaptation rather than imitation. Chinese ceramics had long been admired, collected and emulated in the Islamic world. This was especially so in the Ottoman court and the Safavid court in Persia which had important collections of Chinese blue-and-white porcelain. Such Chinese porcelains influenced the style of Safavid pottery and had a strong impact on the development of Iznik ware. By the mid-16th century, Iznik had its own vocabulary of Turkish floral and abstract motifs in tight designs using a limited palette. Decoration progressed from pure symmetry to subtle rhythms.

== Provenance ==
From the second half of the 19th century until the 1930s European collectors were confused by the different styles of Iznik pottery and assumed that they originated from different pottery producing centres. Although it is now believed that all the pottery was produced in İznik (or Kütahya, see below) the earlier names associated with the different styles are still often used. In the 19th century until the 1860s all Islamic pottery was normally known as 'Persian' ware. However, between 1865 and 1872 the Musée de Cluny in Paris acquired a collection of polychrome fritware pottery with a design that included a bright 'sealing-wax red'. (Note: The collection of 532 items is now housed in the Musée National de la Renaissance in Écouen near Paris.) As all the items in the collection had been obtained on the island of Rhodes it was assumed, erroneously, that the pottery had been manufactured on the island and the term 'Rhodian' ware was adopted for this style. European collectors also purchased a number of pieces decorated in blue, turquoise, sage green and pale purple which were believed to originate from the town of Damascus in Syria and became known as 'Damascus' ware. Blue and white fritware pottery became known as 'Abraham of Kutahia ware' as the decoration was similar to that on a small ewer that once formed part of the collection of Frederick Du Cane Godman and is now in the British Museum. The ewer has an inscription in Armenian script under the glaze on its base stating that the vessel was "in commemoration of Abraham, servant of God, of K'ot'ay [Kütahya]. In this year 959 [AD 1510]". In 1905–1907, during the construction of a new post office in the Sirkeci district of Istanbul near the shore of the Golden Horn, pottery fragments were unearthed that were decorated with spiral designs on a white background. As a result, pottery with similar spiral patterns became known as 'Golden Horn ware'.

It was not until the 1930s that art historians fully realised that the different styles of pottery were probably all produced in Iznik. In 1957 Arthur Lane, keeper of ceramics at the Victoria and Albert Museum, published an influential article in which he reviewed the history of pottery production in the region and proposed a series of dates. He suggested that 'Abraham of Kütahya' ware was produced from 1490 until around 1525, 'Damascus' and 'Golden Horn ware' were produced from 1525 until 1555 and 'Rhodian' ware from around 1555 until the demise of the Iznik pottery industry at the beginning of the 18th century. This chronology has been generally accepted.

=== İznik and Kütahya ===
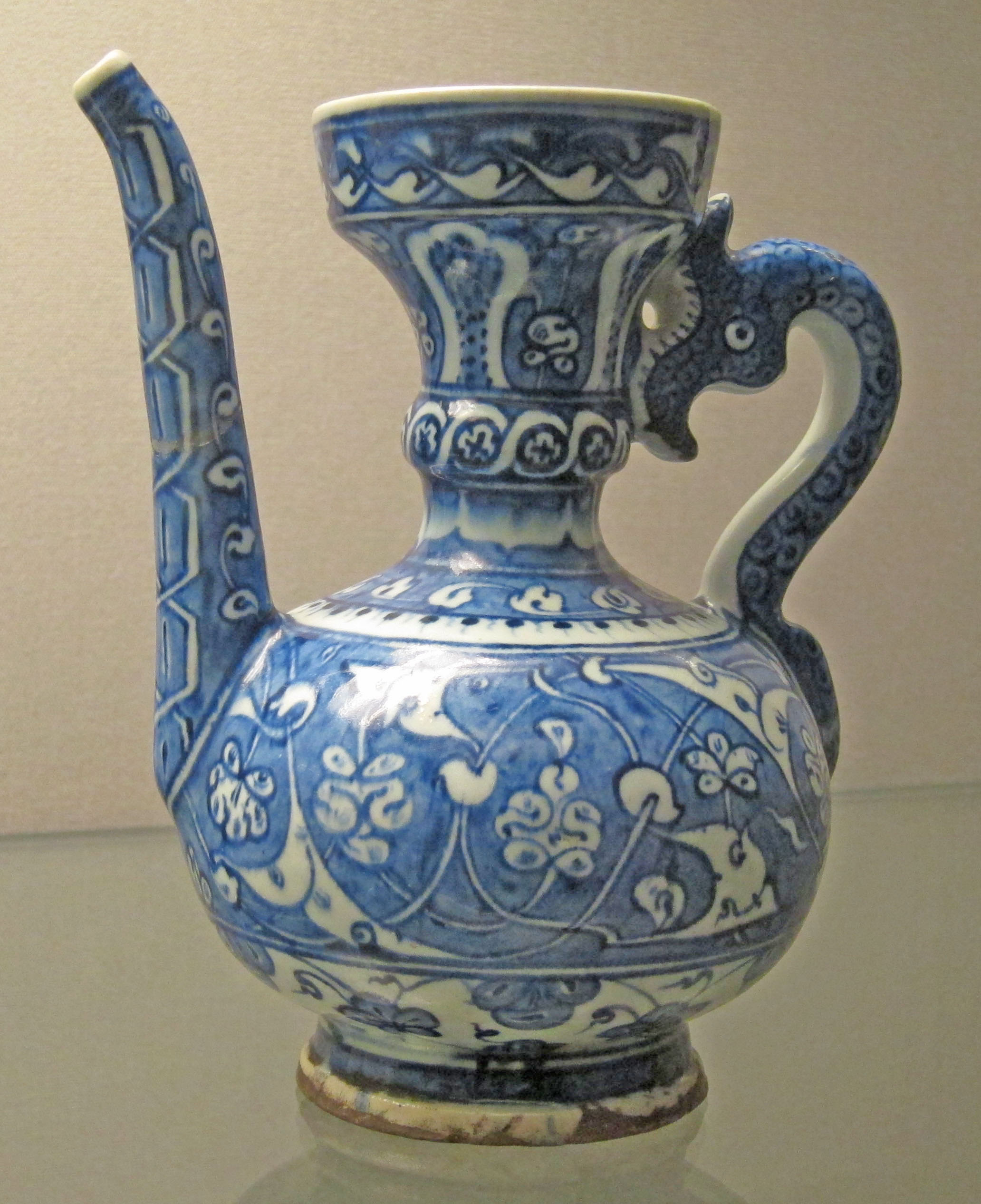
'Abraham of Kutahia' ewer, probably made in Kütahya, dated 1510

The 'Abraham of Kutahia' ewer of 1510 is not the only vessel with a possible Kütahya origin. A damaged water bottle decorated in the 'Golden Horn' style has two underglaze inscriptions in Armenian script; one, dated 1529, refers to the commissioner of the vessel, Bishop Ter Martiros, the other refers to the vessel as being sent as "an object of K'ot'ays" for a monastery. Lane argued that it was unlikely that either the 'Abraham of Kutahia' ewer or the water bottle had been made in Kütahya. However, subsequent archaeological excavations in Kütahya have unearthed fragments of pots in the blue and white Iznik style that had been damaged during manufacture ('wasters') providing evidence that fritware pottery was produced in the town. The designs, materials and manufacturing technique appear to have been similar to that used in İznik. Kütahya is further from Istanbul with less easy access to the capital and was probably only a small pottery producing centre in the 16th century. Nevertheless, it is likely that some of the pottery that is currently labelled as 'Iznik' was manufactured in Kütahya. The art historian Julian Raby has written: "For the moment we have no choice but to call all Ottoman glazed pottery of the 16th and 17th centuries by the generic label 'Iznik', and to hope that in time we can learn to recognise the diagnostic features of contemporary 'Kütahya ware'."

=== Imperial workshops in Istanbul ===
During the first half of the 16th century underglaze painted blue-and-white ceramics were also produced in Istanbul. A surviving account book for 1526 that records wages paid to craftsmen employed by the Ottoman court, lists a tilemaker from Tabriz with ten assistants. The tilemaker was probably one of the craftsmen brought to Istanbul after Selim I had temporary captured Tabriz in 1514. The tile workshops were located in the Tekfur Sarayı neighbourhood of the city near the Palace of the Porphyrogenitus. The craftsmen are believed to have been responsible for all the tiles on the imperial buildings until the construction of the Süleymaniye Mosque in the 1550s. Most of the tiles were decorated with coloured glazes using the cuerda seca (dry cord) technique, but in a few cases the tiles were underglaze painted in cobalt blue and turquoise. The cuerda seca technique created a new way to glaze these tiles while not requiring the intense labor previous techniques had. These underglaze tiles were used on the revetments of the facade of the Holy Mantle Pavilion (Privy Chamber) in the grounds of the Topkapı Palace and within the mausoleum of Çoban Mustafa Pasha (d. 1529) in Gebze. The most striking examples are five extremely large rectangular tiles, 1.25 m (4.1 ft) in length, that form part of the façade of the Circumcision Room (Sünnet Odası) of the Topkapı Palace. Although the building dates from 1641, the tiles are believed to come from an earlier structure on the same site that was erected in 1527–1528. These large tiles are decorated with very elaborate designs that suggests the close involvement of the court designers.

Although there are no surviving records detailing the output of the imperial workshops, it is likely that the potters manufacturing the blue-and-white underglaze painted tiles also made other items for the court. The art historian Gülru Necipoğlu has suggested that an unusual gilded mosque lamp and a decorative ball that come from the Yavuz Selim Mosque should be attributed to the imperial workshop. The lamp and ball have underglaze inscriptional bands in cobalt blue but the mosque itself is decorated only with cuerda seca tiles. (Note: The hanging mosque ornament is on display at the Walters Art Museum in Baltimore (Inv. no. 48.1022). The mosque lamp is displayed at the Tiled Kiosk (Çinili Köşk) in Istanbul.) The number of tilemakers employed by the imperial workshops dwindled so that by 1566 only three remained. With the construction of the Süleymaniye Mosque, Iznik became a major center for the manufacture of underglaze tiles.

== Miletus ware (15th century) ==
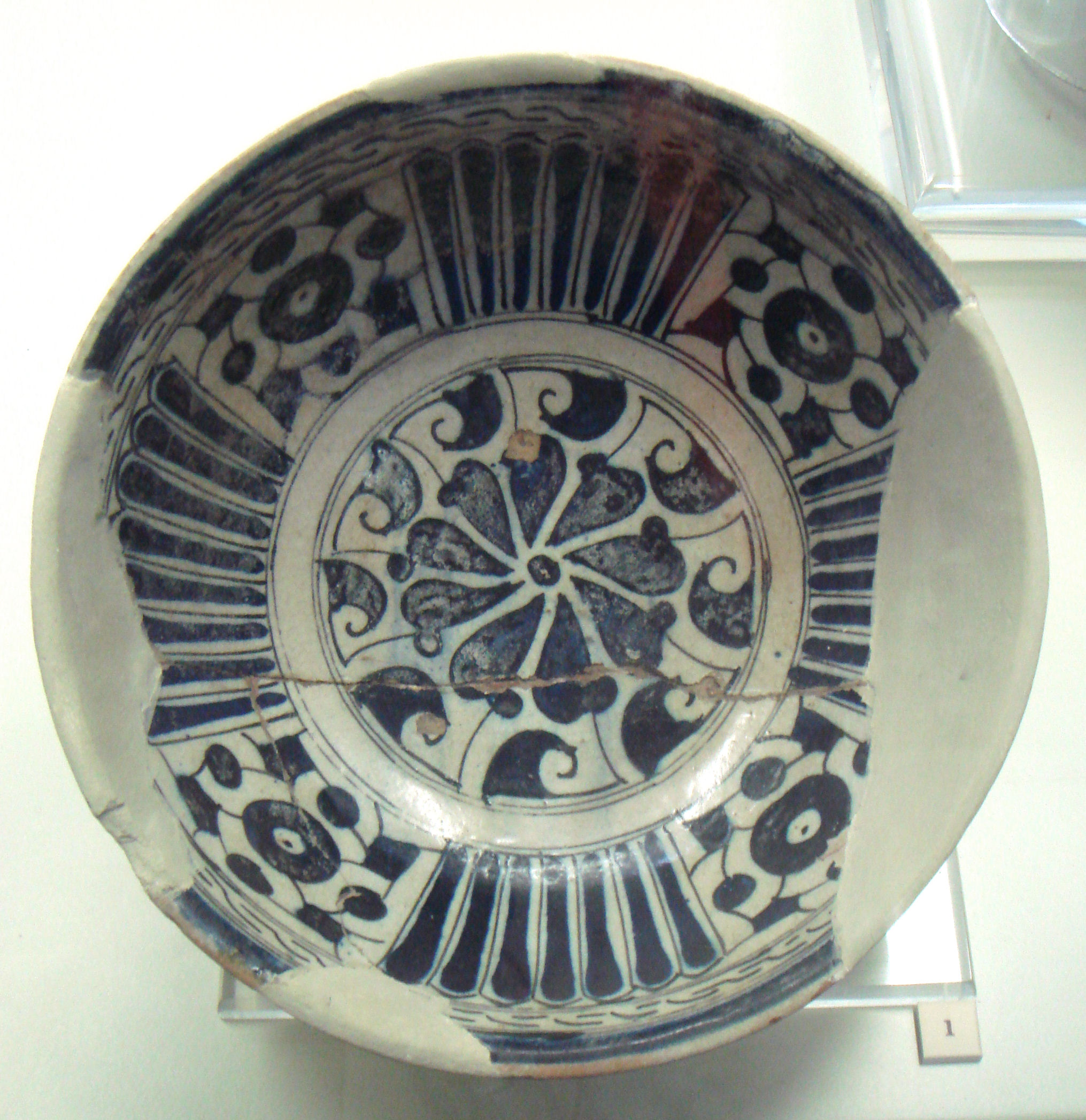
Fragmentary blue and white Miletus ware bowl

Archaeological excavations in İznik conducted by Oktay Aslanapa in the early 1960s revealed that the town had been an important centre for the production of simple earthenware pottery well before the introduction of the blue-and-white fritware. The excavations uncovered fragments of what is confusingly known as 'Miletus ware'. The discovery of kiln-wasters confirmed that the pottery was manufactured locally. The name originated from the discovery of sherds during excavations by the German archaeologist Friedrich Sarre at Miletus on the western coast of Anatolia in the early 1930s. As Miletus had a long history as a pottery producing centre, it was erroneously assumed that the pottery was produced locally and it became known as 'Miletus ware'. It is now believed that İznik was the main centre for the production of 'Miletus ware' with smaller quantities being produced at Kütahya and Akçaalan. The excavations have not provided a clear date for the pottery but it is assumed to belong to the 15th century. The archaeological evidence from other sites in Turkey suggests that Miletus ware was produced in large quantities and widely distributed.

Miletus ware used a red clay body covered with a white slip which was painted with simple designs under a transparent alkaline lead glaze. The designs were usually in dark cobalt blue but also sometimes in turquoise, purple and green. Many dishes have a central rosette surrounded by concentric bands of gadroons.

== Fritware ==
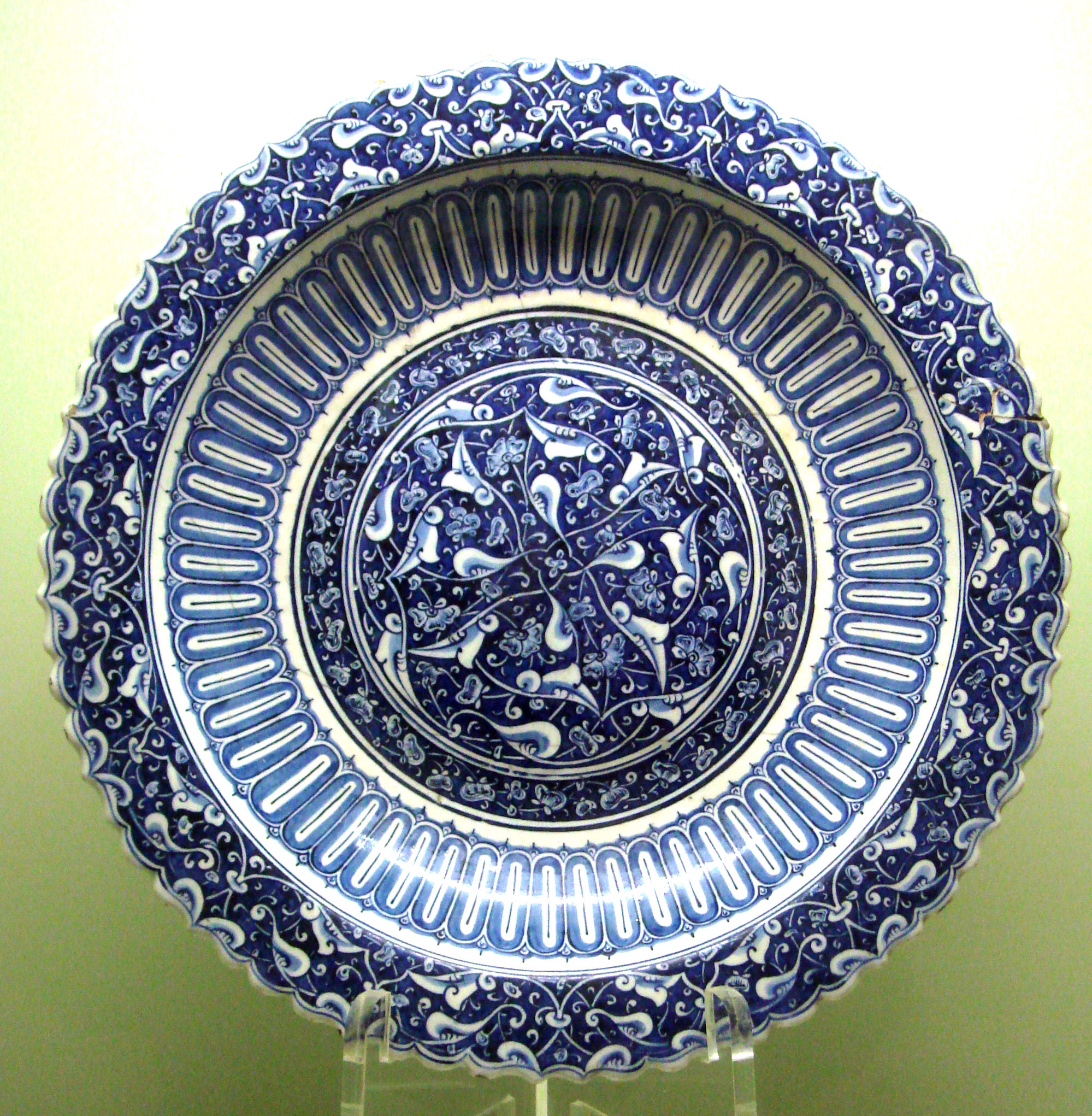
Large dish (charger) with foliate rim. Design reserved on a dark cobalt ground, c. 1480

From the late 15th century, potters in Iznik began producing wares that were decorated in cobalt blue on a white fritware body under a clear glaze. Both the manufacturing technique and the underglaze designs were very different from that used in the production of Miletus ware. Fritware had been made in the Near East from the 13th century, but Iznik fritware, achieving a white surface, was a major innovation.

Fritware (also called stonepaste) is a composite material made from quartz sand mixed with small amounts of finely ground glass (called frit) and some clay. When fired, the glass frit melts and binds the other components together. In the 13th century the town of Kashan in Iran was an important centre for the production of fritware. Abū'l-Qāsim, who came from a family of tilemakers in the city, wrote a treatise on precious stones in 1301 that included a chapter on the manufacture of fritware. His recipe specified a fritware body containing a mixture of 10 parts silica to 1 part glass frit and 1 part clay. There is no equivalent treatise on the manufacture of Iznik pottery, but analysis of the surviving pieces indicates that the potters in İznik used roughly similar proportions. In Kashan the frit was prepared by mixing powdered quartz with soda which acted as a flux. The mixture was then heated in a kiln. In İznik, lead oxide was added to the frit, in addition to quartz and soda.

As the fritware paste lacked plasticity and was difficult to work on the wheel, vessels were seldom made in one piece. Instead they were formed in separate sections that were allowed to dry and then stuck together using the fritware paste. This additive technique meant that there was a tendency for the final vessels to have slightly angular shapes. Dishes were almost certainly made using a mould attached to a potter's wheel. A lump of fritware paste would have been rolled out into a sheet much like when a cook rolls out pastry. The sheet would have been placed on the mould to form the inside of the dish. The underside of the dish would have been shaped using a template as the mould was rotated on the wheel. When the paste was partly dry the foliate rim would have been sculptured by hand.

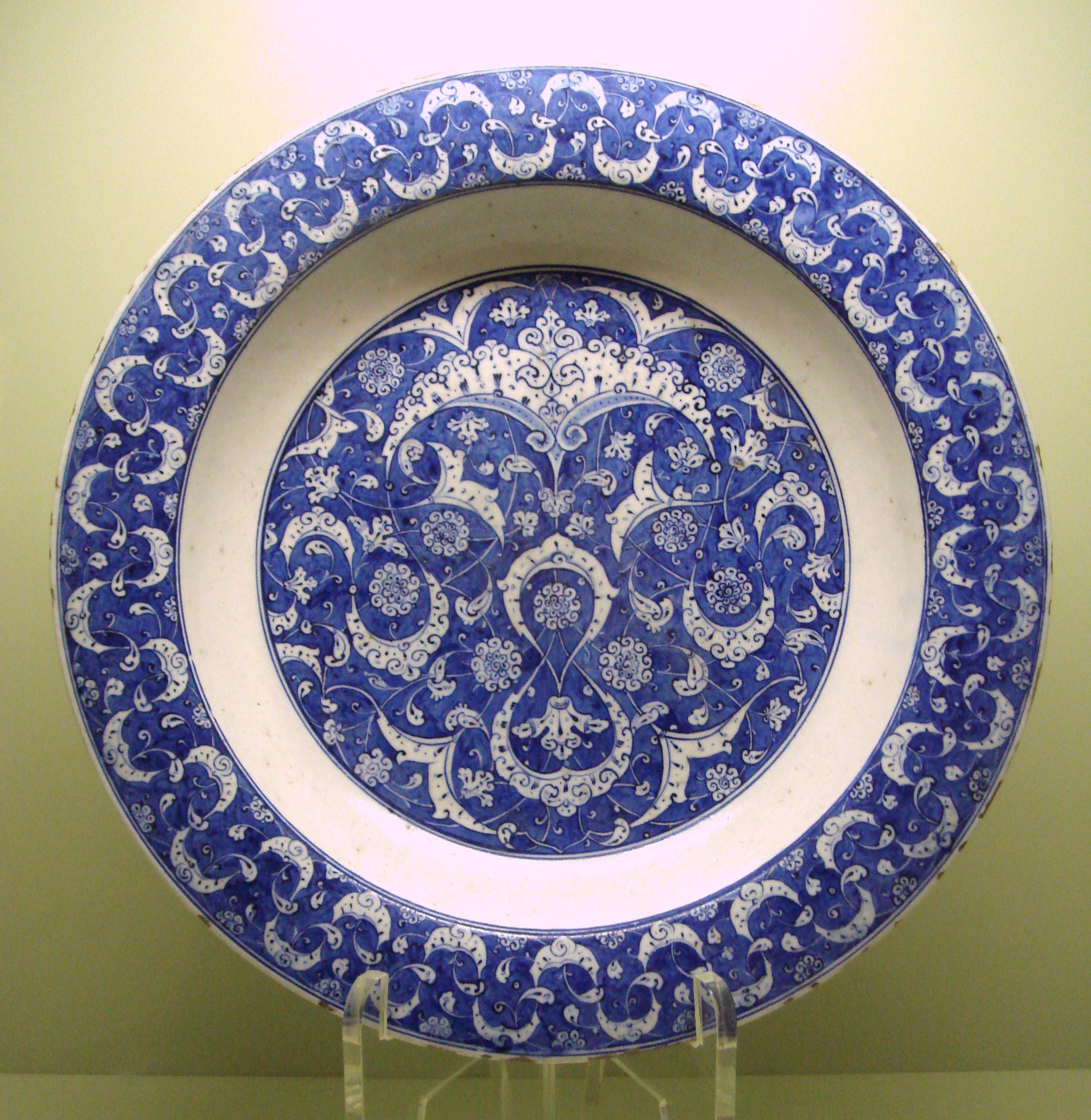
Large dish (charger), 1500–1510

The fritware body was coated with a thin layer of white slip. This had a similar composition to the fritware paste used for the body, but the components were more finely ground and more carefully selected to avoid iron impurities that would discolour the white surface. It is likely that an organic binder, such as tragacanth gum, was also added. Although in his treatise Abū'l-Qāsim recommended that fritware vessels were allowed to dry in the sun before being decorated, it is probable that Iznik ceramics was given a biscuit firing. The pottery was painted with pigments that had been mixed with glass frit and ground in a wet quern. For some designs the outlines were pounced through a stencil.

In the early period only cobalt blue was used for decoration. The cobalt ore was probably obtained from the village of Qamsar near the town of Kashan in central Iran. Qamsar had long been an important source of cobalt and is mentioned by Abū'l-Qāsim Qamsarin in his treatise. From around 1520 turquoise (copper oxide) was added to the palette. This was followed by purple (manganese oxide), green, grey and black. The distinctive bright bole red was introduced in around 1560. The red slip containing iron oxide was applied in a thick layer under the glaze. Even after the introduction of a range of different pigments, vessels were sometimes still produced with a restricted palette.

The wares were glazed with a lead-alkaline-tin glaze, whose composition has been found from analysis to be lead oxide 25-30 percent, silica 45–55 percent, sodium oxide 8–14 percent and tin oxide 4–7 percent. Tin oxide is often employed to render glaze opaque but in İznik glazes, it remains in solution and is transparent.

Abū'l-Qāsim described the use of earthenware saggars with a fitting lid. Although Miletus ware bowls were stacked in the kiln one on top of the other separated by spurs, the lack of spur marks on Iznik fritware suggests that saggars were used. Firing was done in an updraft kiln, to about 900 °C.

== Blue-and-white ware (1480–1520) ==
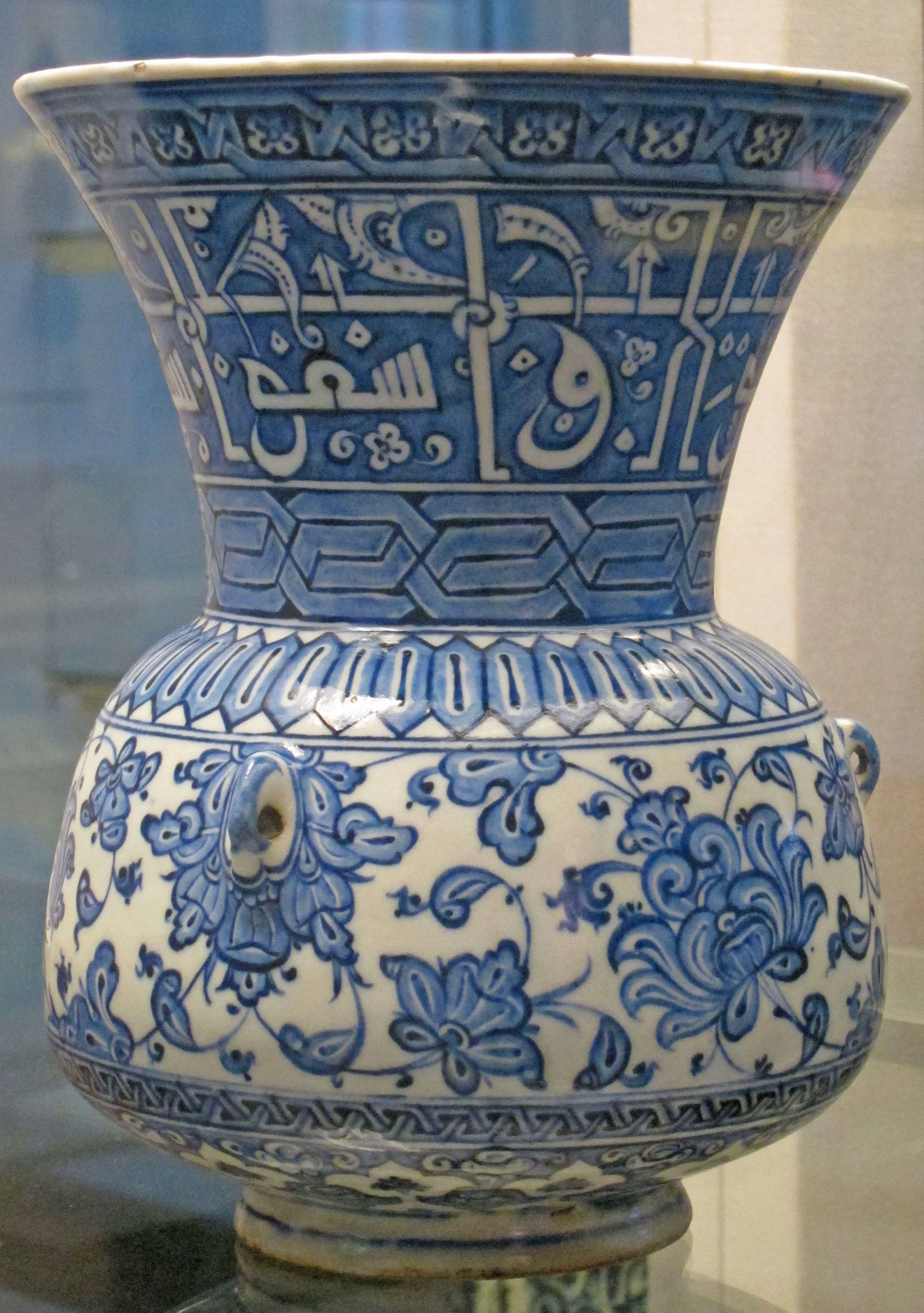
Mosque lamp with lotuses c. 1510, similar to four lamps that hung in the mausoleum of Bayezid II in Istanbul

In the final decades of the 15th century, potters in Iznik began producing blue-and-white fritware ceramics with designs that were clearly influenced by the Ottoman court in Istanbul. There are no surviving written documents that provide details on how this came about. The earliest specific mention of Iznik pottery is in the accounts for the Imperial kitchens of the Tokapi palace for 1489–1490 where the purchase of 97 vessels is recorded. The earliest datable objects are blue-and-white border tiles that decorate the mausoleum (türbe) in Bursa of Şehzade Mahmud, one of the sons of Bayezid II, who died in 1506–1507.

The term 'Abraham of Kütahya ware' has been applied to all the early blue-and-white Iznik pottery as the 'Abraham of Kütahya' ewer, dating from 1510, is the only documented vessel. The art historian Julian Raby has argued that the term is misleading as the ewer is atypical and has instead proposed the term 'Baba Nakkaş ware' after the name of the leading designer attached to the Imperial court in Istanbul. The earliest surviving Iznik fritware objects, dating from probably around 1480, are believed to be a group of vessels painted in a dark cobalt blue in which much of the dense decoration is in white on a blue background. The vessels have separate areas of Ottoman arabesque and Chinese floral designs. The combination of these two styles is referred to as Rumi-Hatayi where Rumi denotes the Ottoman arabesque patterns and Hatayi the Chinese inspired floral patterns. Many of the meticulously painted arabesque motifs of this early period are believed to be influenced by Ottoman metalwork.

Although both the use of cobalt blue on a white background and the shape of large dishes were clearly influenced by Chinese porcelain from the Yuan and Ming dynasties, the early Iznik fritware dishes were far from being direct copies of Chinese designs. In some pieces, such as the front of a large charger with a foliate rim in the Çinili Koşk Museum in Istanbul, the decoration used only Ottoman Rumi designs.

During the first two decades of the 16th century there was a gradual shift in style with the introduction of a brighter blue, more use of a white background and a greater use of floral motifs. Dating from this period are four mosque lamps from the mausoleum of Sultan Bayezid II in Istanbul which was constructed in 1512–13. A fifth lamp that probably also came from the mausoleum is now in the British Museum. These pottery mosque lamps are of a similar shape to Mamluk glass lamps. There was a tradition of hanging pottery lamps in mosques dating back at least to the 13th century. The opaque pottery lamps would have been completely useless for lighting and they instead served a symbolic and decorative function. The lamps from Bayezid II's mausoleum are decorated with bands of geometric motifs and kufic inscriptions but around the centre they have a very prominent broad band containing large rosettes and stylized lotus blossoms.

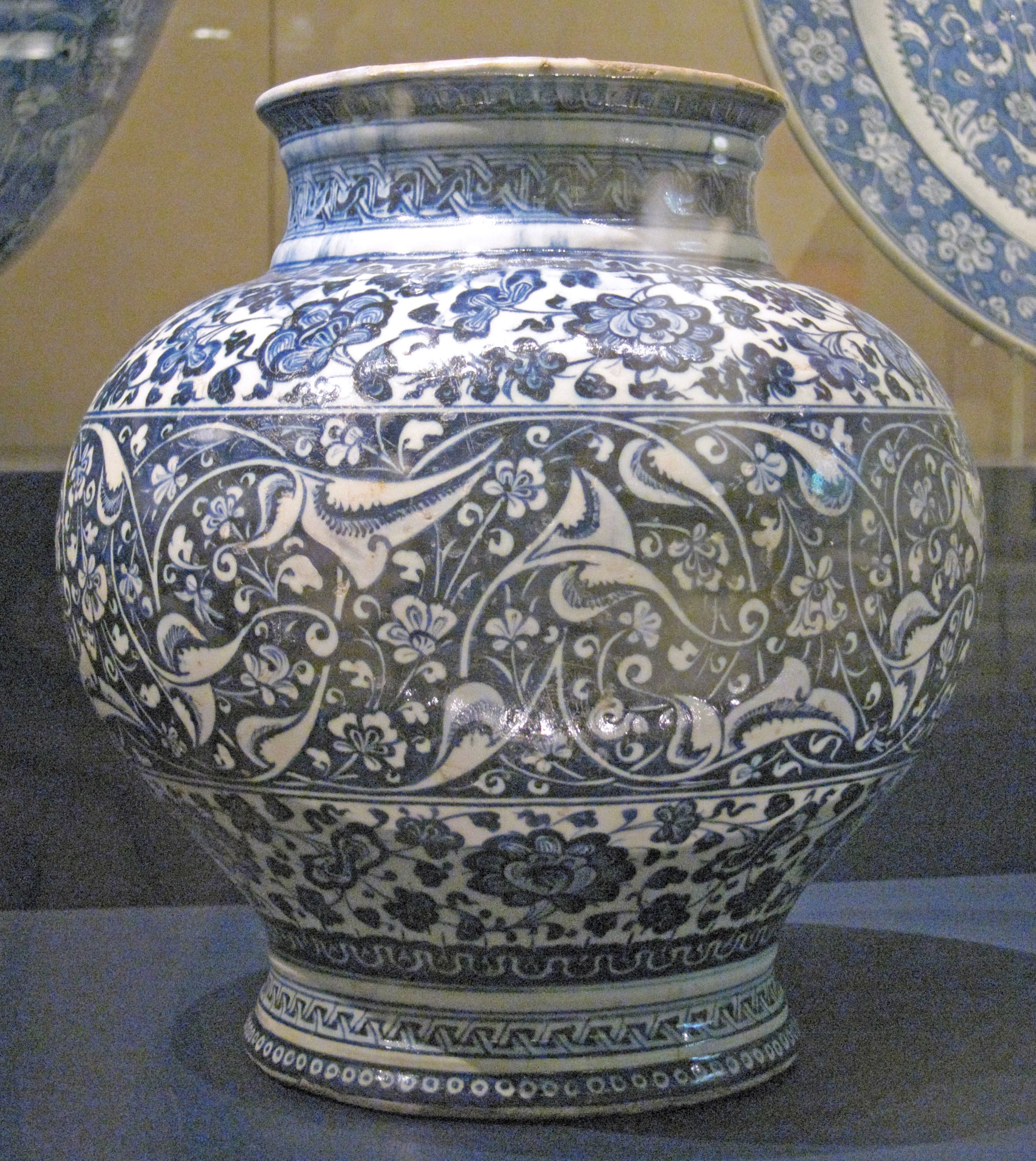
Jar with reserved decoration on a dark cobalt ground, c. 1480

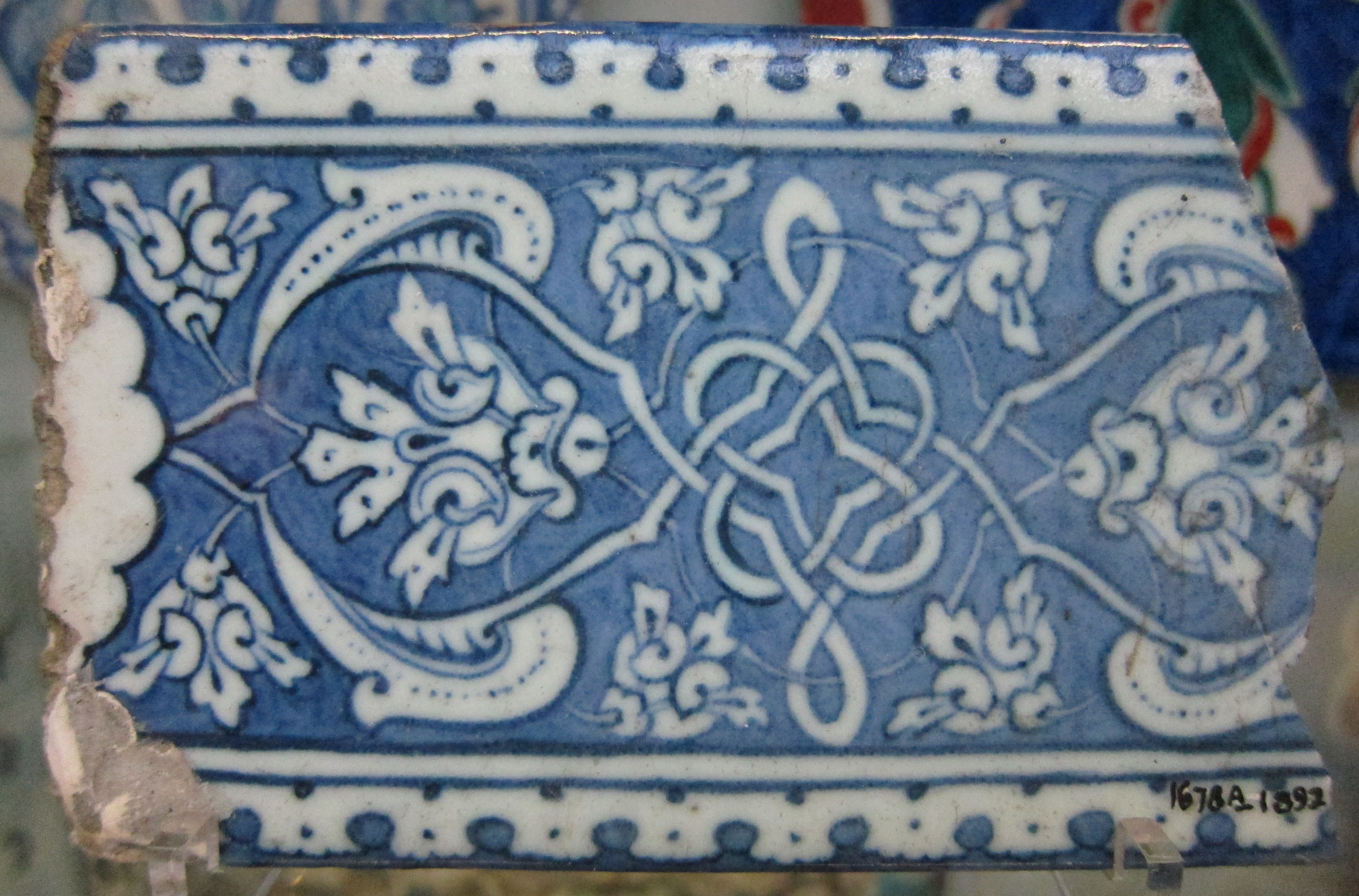
Fragmentary tile similar to those in mausoleum of Şehzade Mahmud in Bursa, 1506–1507

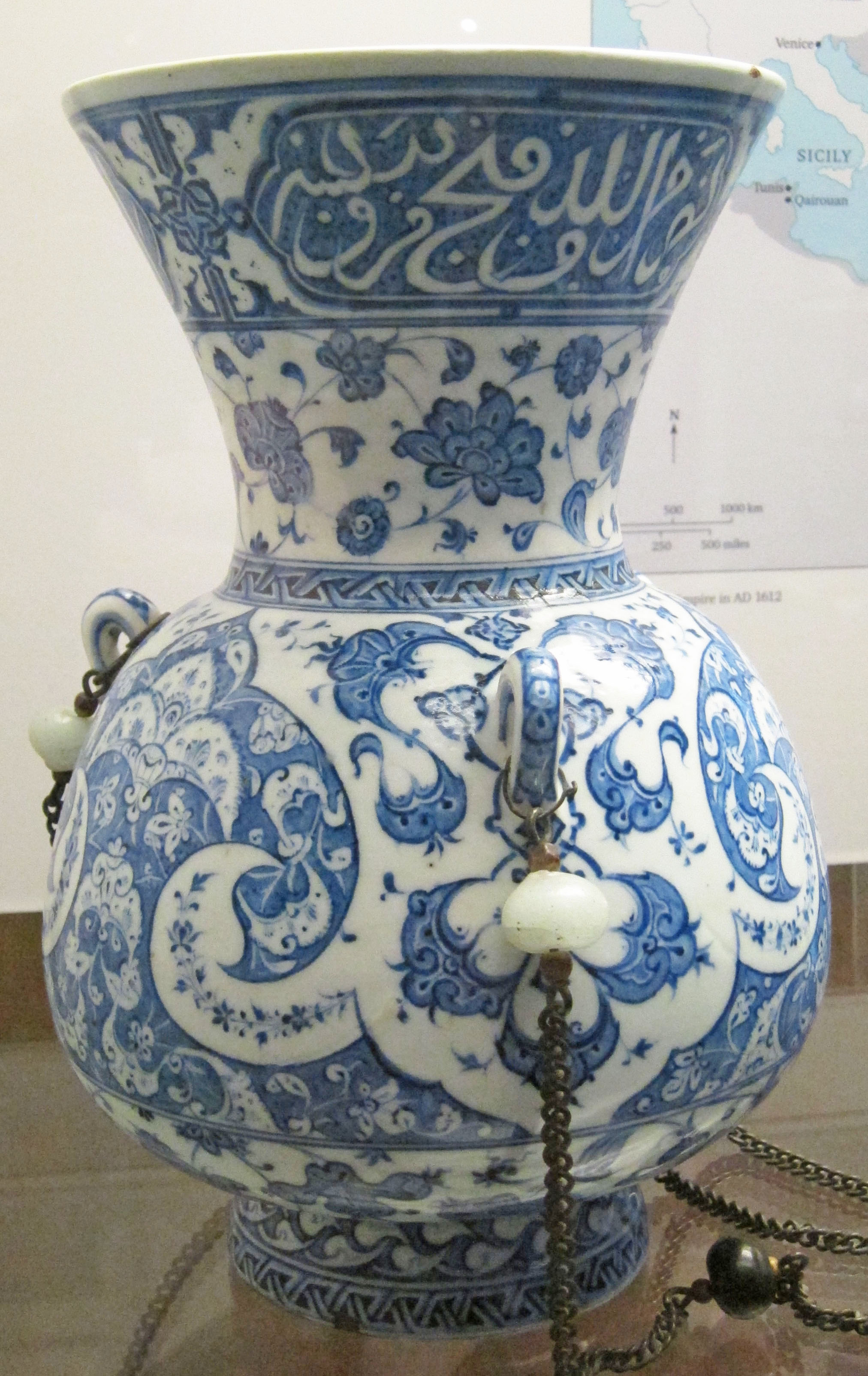
Mosque lamp, c. 1510

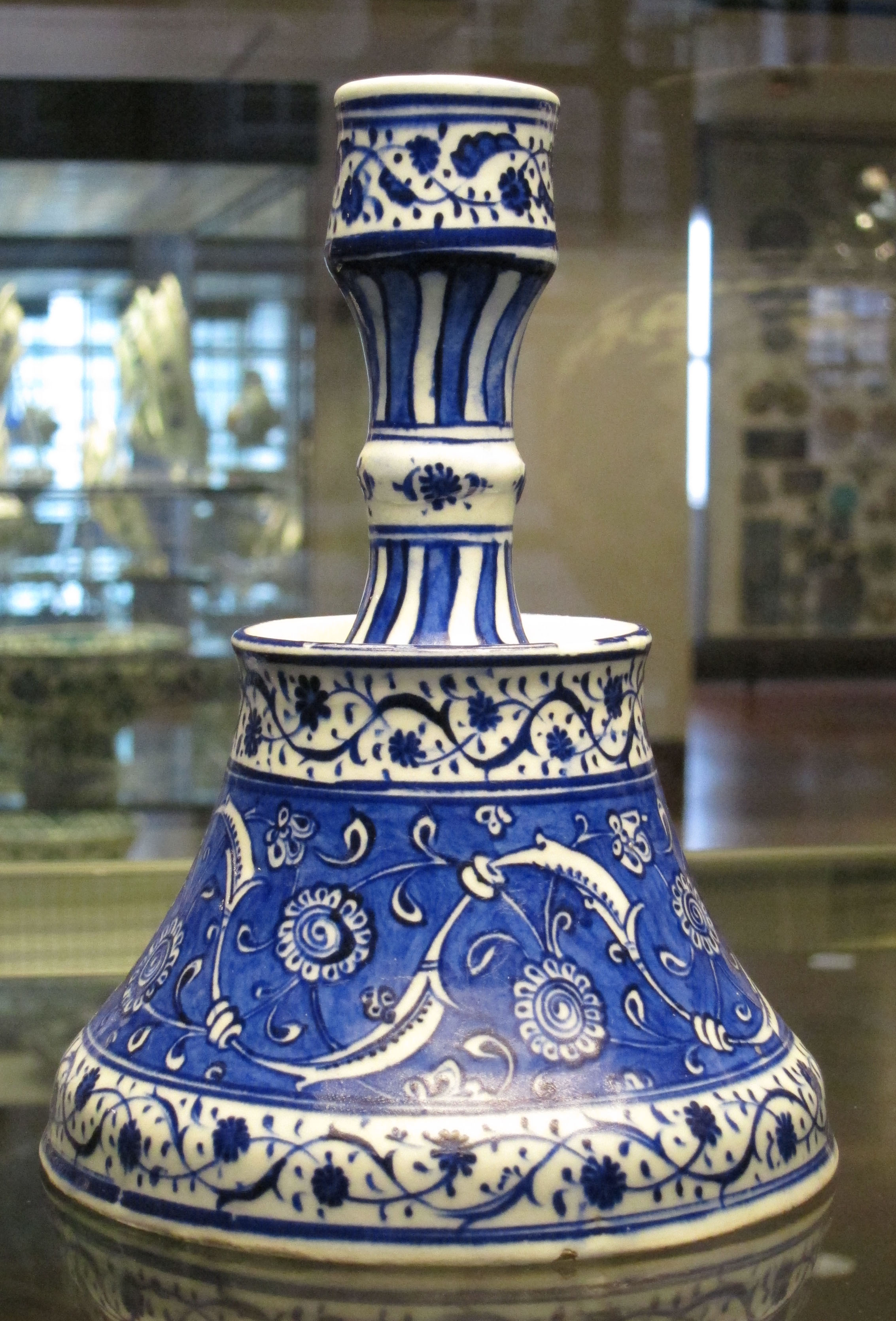
Candlestick, c. 1525

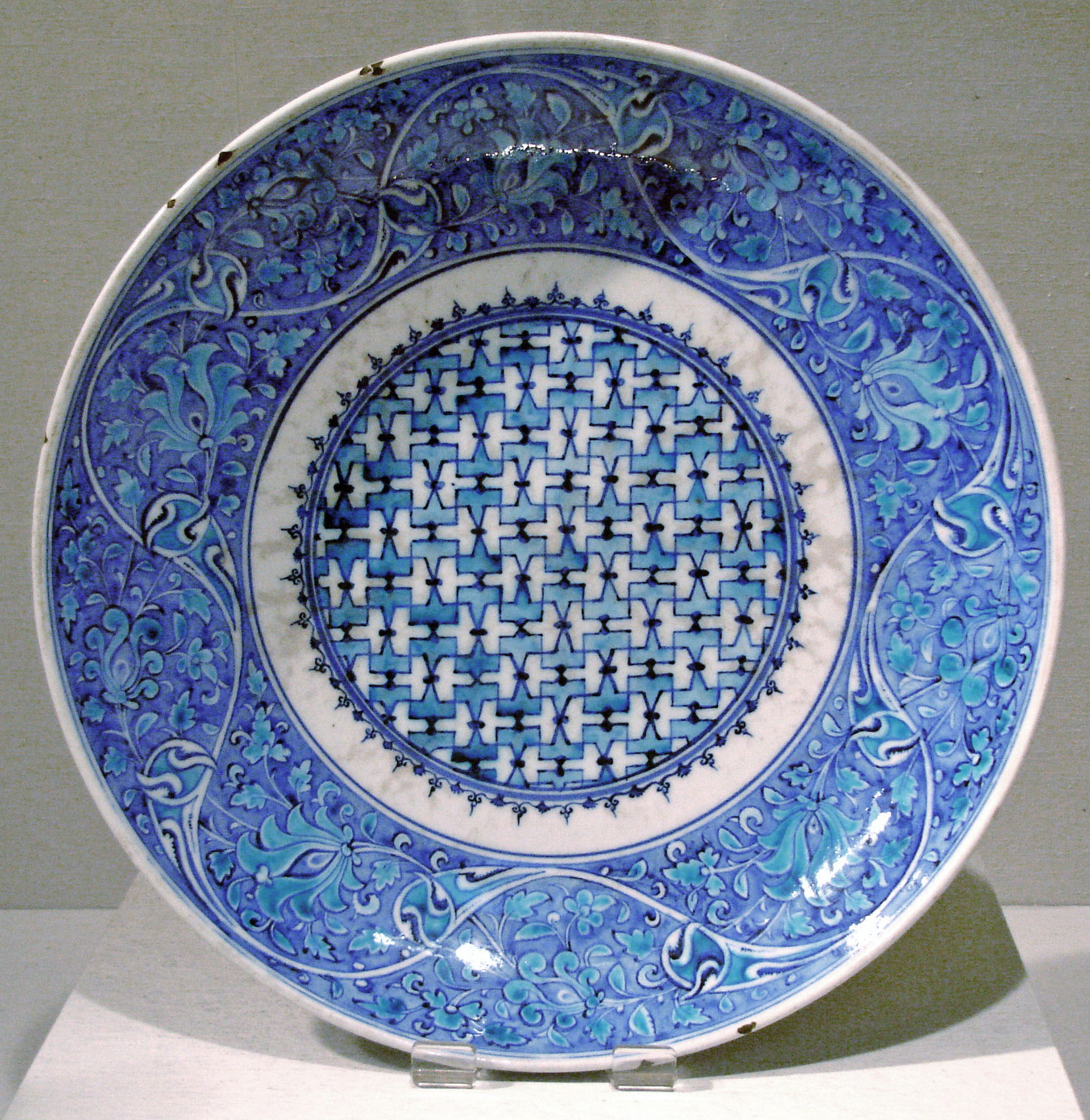
Rimless deep bowl, c. 1525–1530

=== Form ===
The two most prevalent colors on the dish are white and blue, which is a direct influence of Chinese art. The base of the ceramic is white color so that the blue intricate designs will display great contrast. The blue color used on the dish is striking, allowing the delicate vegetal designs to power through and shine.

== Patronage by the Ottoman court: Süleyman the Magnificent ==
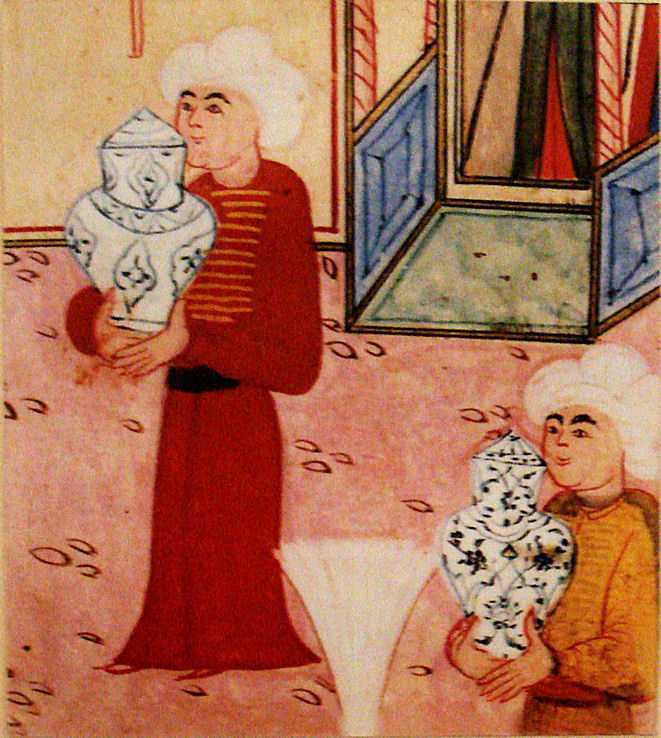
Fruit sellers carrying ceramic jars in front of Sultan Murad III, c. 1582

After the conquest of Constantinople in 1453, the Ottoman sultans started a huge building programme. In these buildings, especially those commissioned by Süleyman, his wife Hürrem (Roxelana) and his Grand Vizier Rüstem Pasha, large quantities of tiles were used. The Sultan Ahmed Mosque in Istanbul (the "Blue Mosque") alone contains 20,000 tiles. The Rüstem Pasha Mosque is more densely tiled and tiles were used extensively in the Topkapı Palace. As a result of this demand, tiles dominated the output of the Iznik potteries.

Under Süleyman the Magnificent (1520–1566), demand for Iznik wares increased. Jugs, hanging lamps, cups, bowls and dishes were produced, inspired by metalwork and illuminated books as well as Chinese ceramics. Many large dishes were made with looser designs, incorporating ships, animals, trees and flowers. The dishes appear to have been made for display, as most have pierced footrings so that they can be hung up, but they have been observed also to be scratched from use. Designs in the 1520s include the saz style in which a long, serrated saz (reed) leaf, dynamically arranged, is balanced by static rosette forms. In the second half of the sixteenth century the more natural quatre fleurs style was also introduced. This used a repertoire of stylised tulips, carnations, roses and hyacinths. It was promoted by Kara Memi (Kara Mehmed Çelebi) who by 1557/8 was the chief artist of Sultan Süleyman's court.

== 'Golden Horn ware' (c. 1530 – c. 1550) ==
The so-called 'Golden Horn ware' was a variation on the blue-and-white decoration that was popular from the late 1520s to 1550s. Golden Horn ware was so named because sherds in this style were excavated in the Golden Horn area of Istanbul. (Note: A bowl excavated at Sirkenci in Istanbul is now in the Victoria and Albert Museum, London (Inv. No. 790–1905)) It was later realized that the pottery was made in İznik as some motifs on the vessels closely resembled those used on other blue-and-white Iznik pottery. The decoration consists of a series of thin spirals adorned with small leaves. The narrow rims of dishes are painted with a meandering pattern. The design is similar to the illuminated spiral scrolls used as a background to Sultan Suleyman's Tuğra, or imperial monogram. Julian Raby has used the term 'Tuğrakeş spiral ware' as the tuğrakeş were the specialist calligraphers in the Ottoman court. The earlier vessels were painted in cobalt blue while later vessels often include turquoise, olive-green and black. A number of dishes dating from this period show the influence of Italian pottery. The small bowls and a large flat rims are similar in shape to maiolica tondino dishes that were popular in Italy between 1500 and 1530.

The 1520s was a period which saw the spiral-decorated ‘Golden Horn’ wares with their close link to imperial manuscript illumination, and the close relationship between imperial architecture and pottery vessels produced at Iznik, and an adaptation of Chinese porcelain designs represented by the collections of the Topkapi Saray.

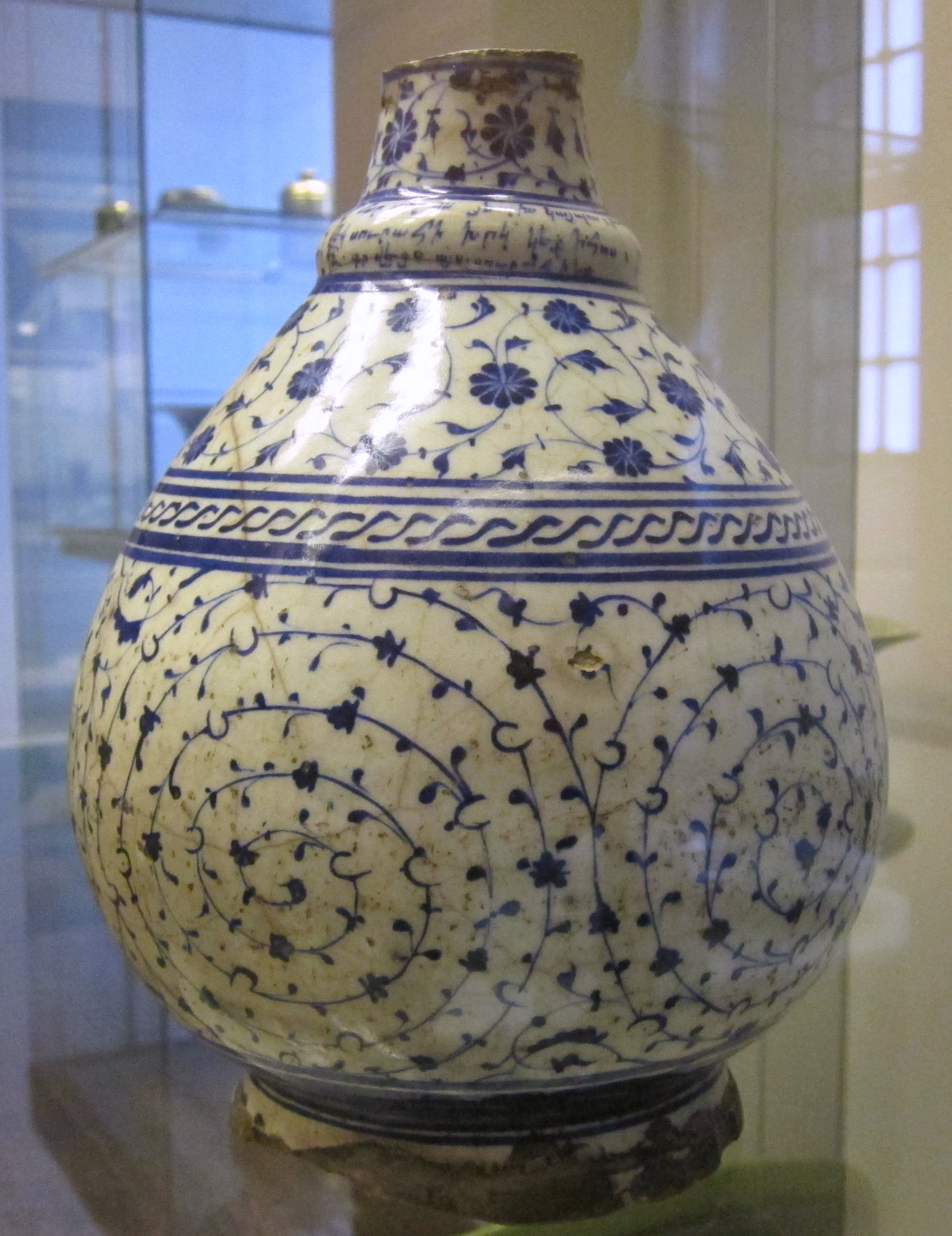
Cut down water bottle, probably made in Kütahya, dated 1529

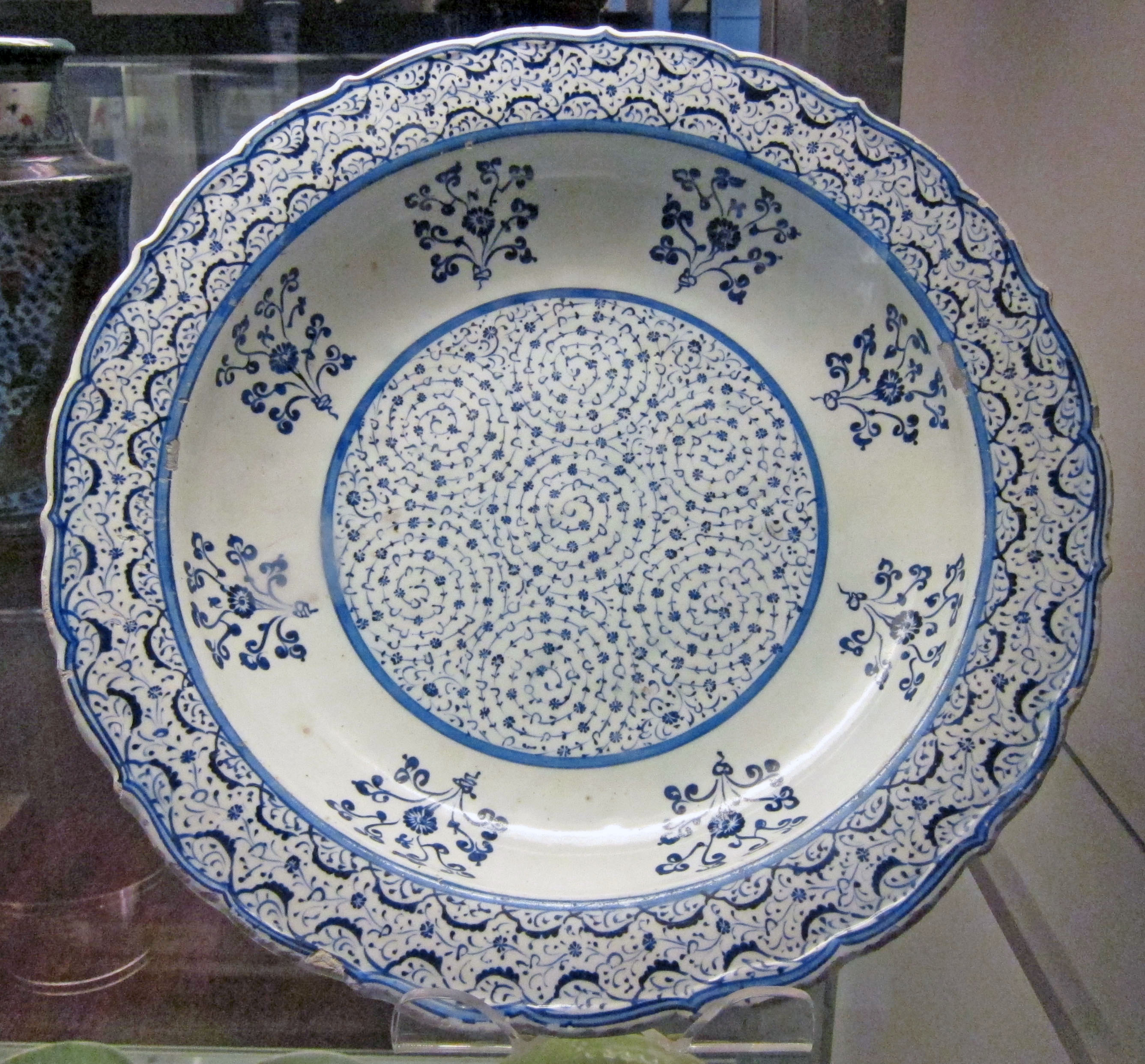
Deep dish with foliate rim, c. 1530

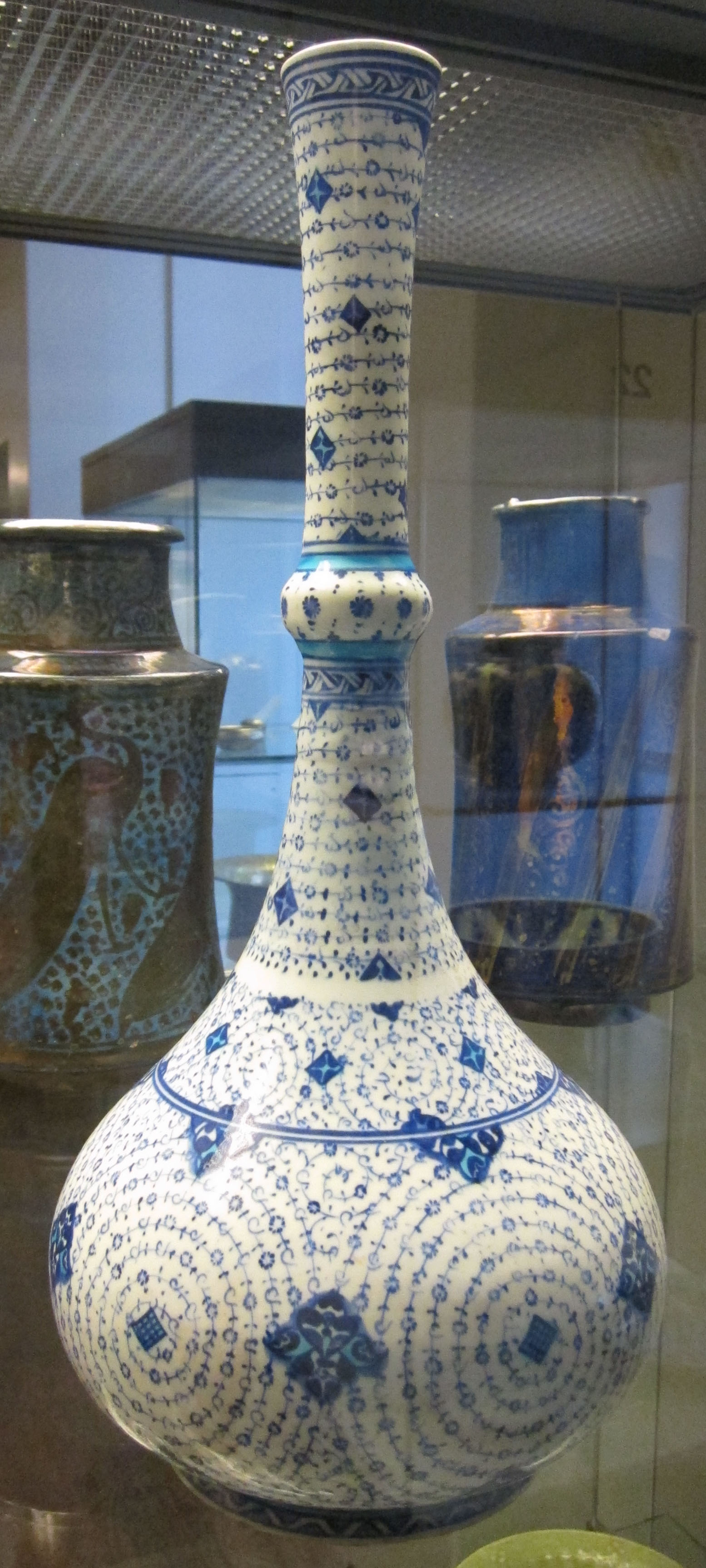
Water bottle, c. 1530–1535

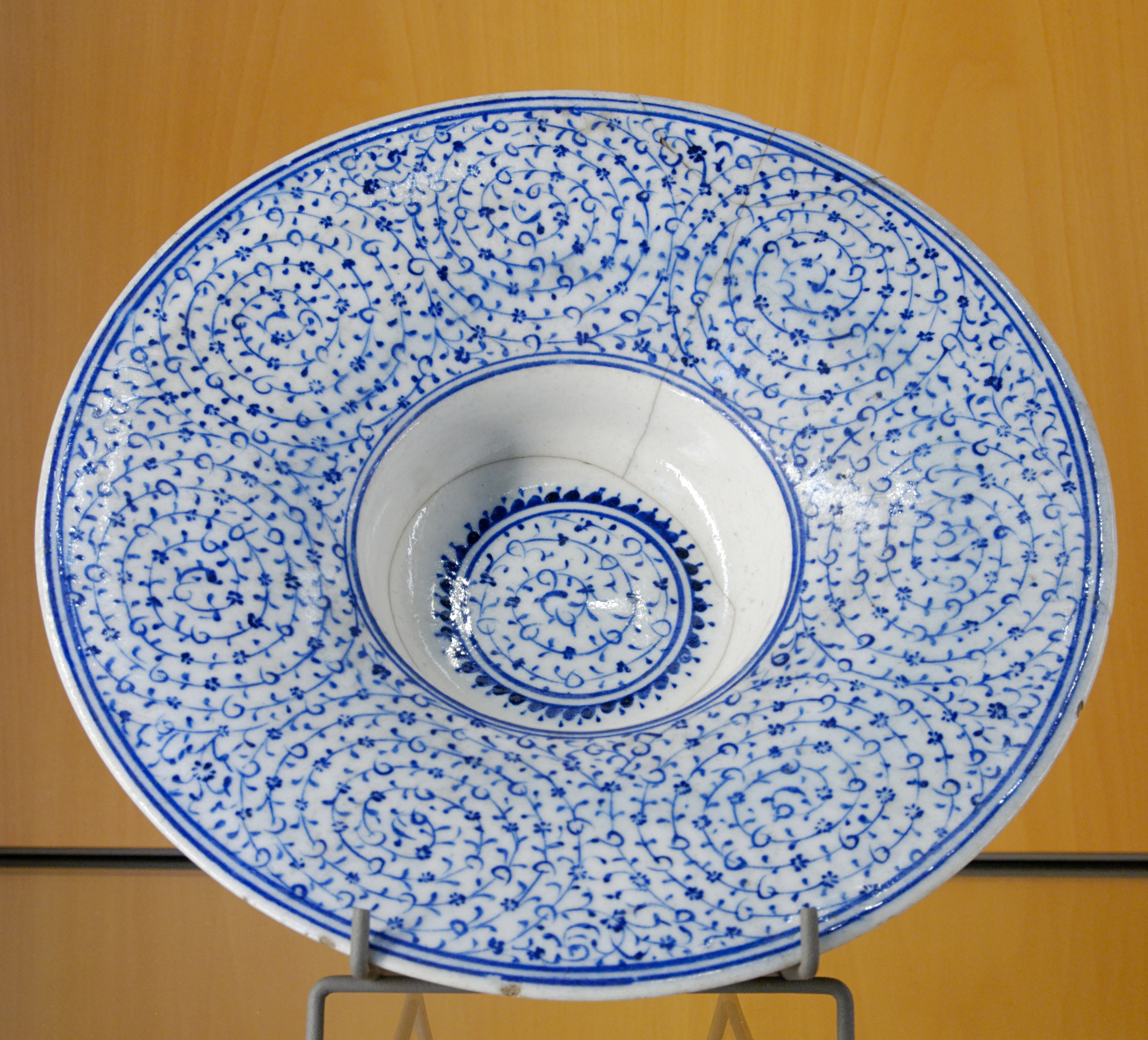
Tondino dish, c. 1530–1540

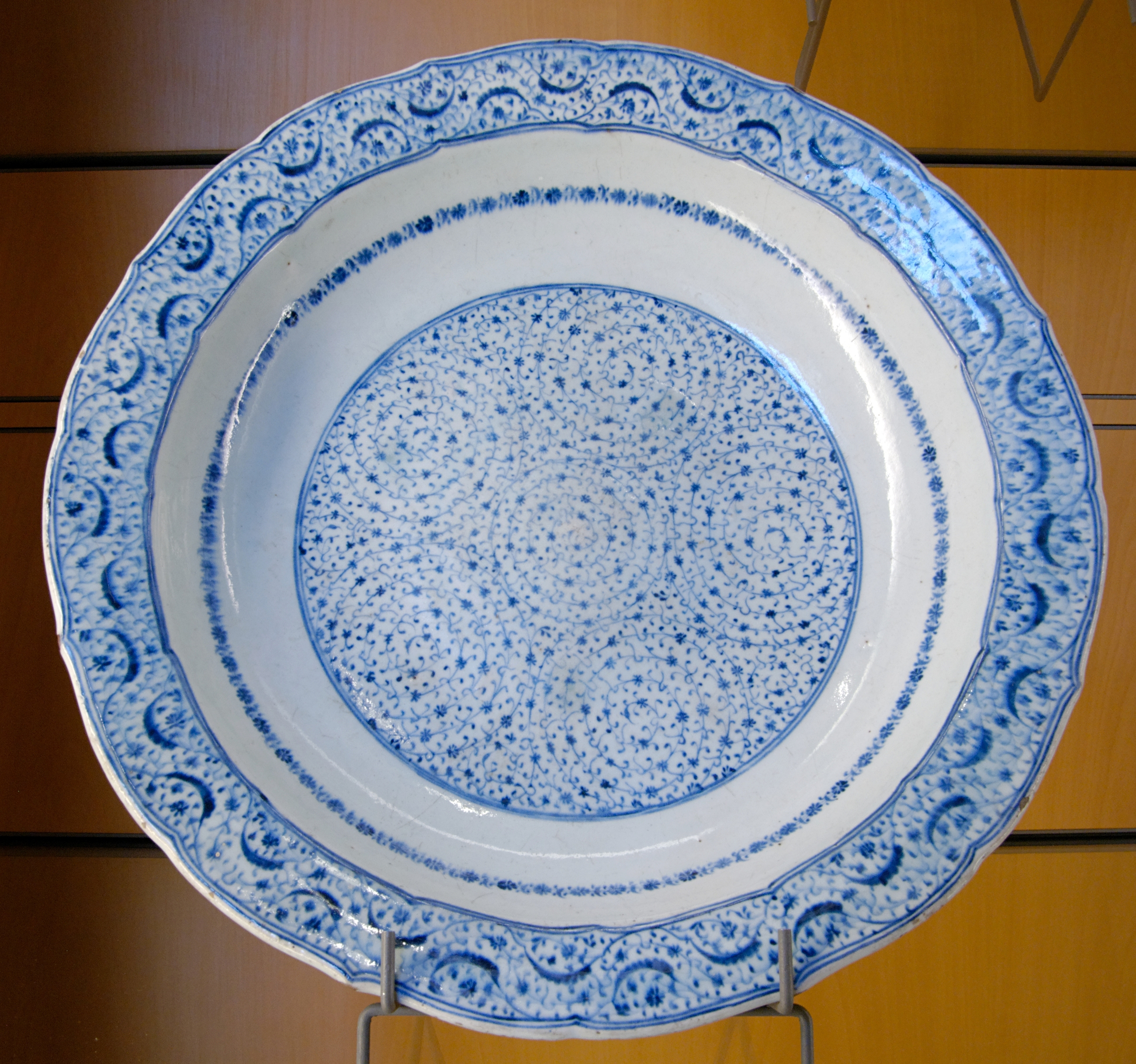
Deep dish with foliate rim, c. 1530–1540

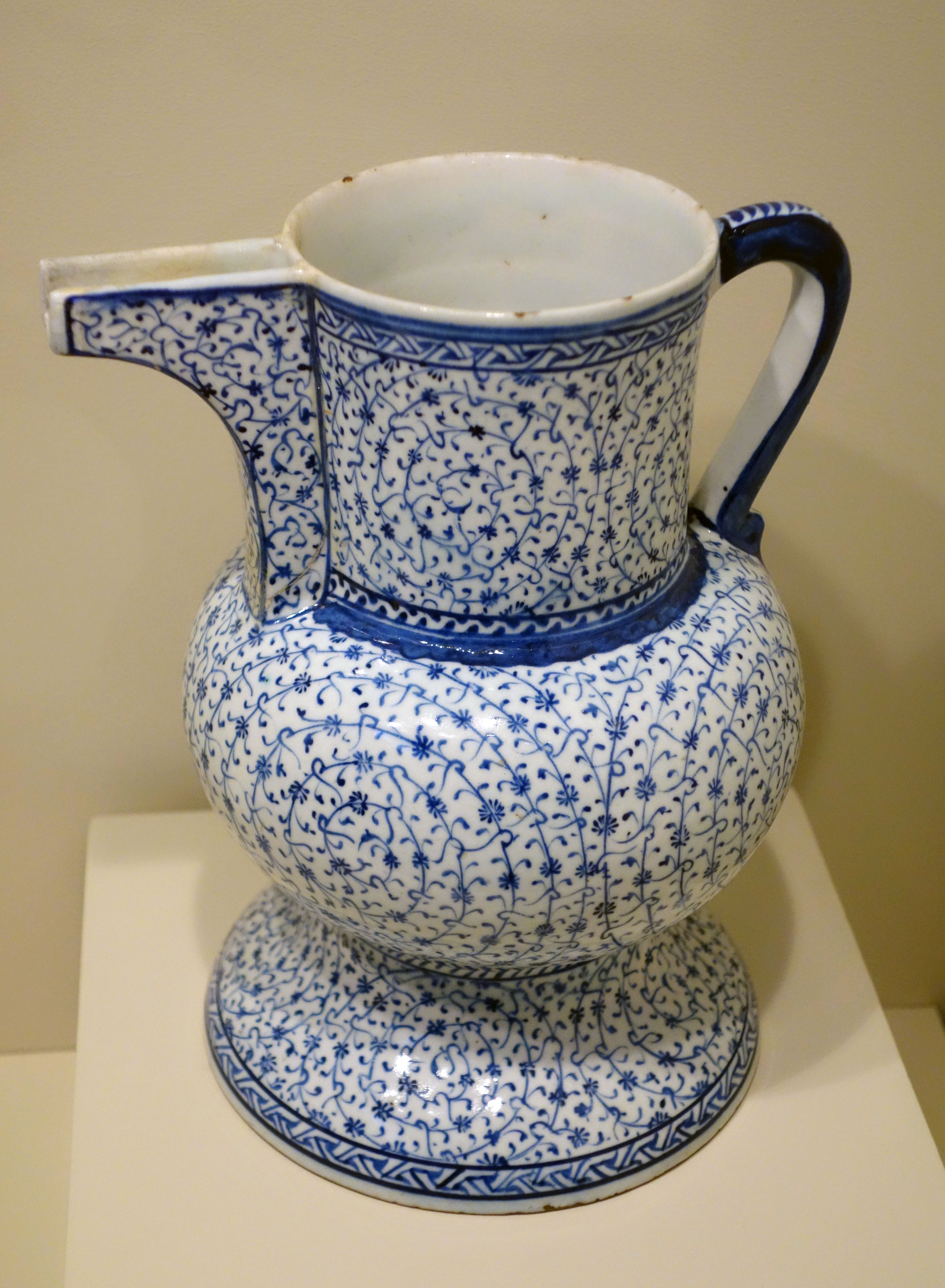
Ewer, c. 1530–1540

== 'Damascus ware' (c. 1540 – c. 1555) ==
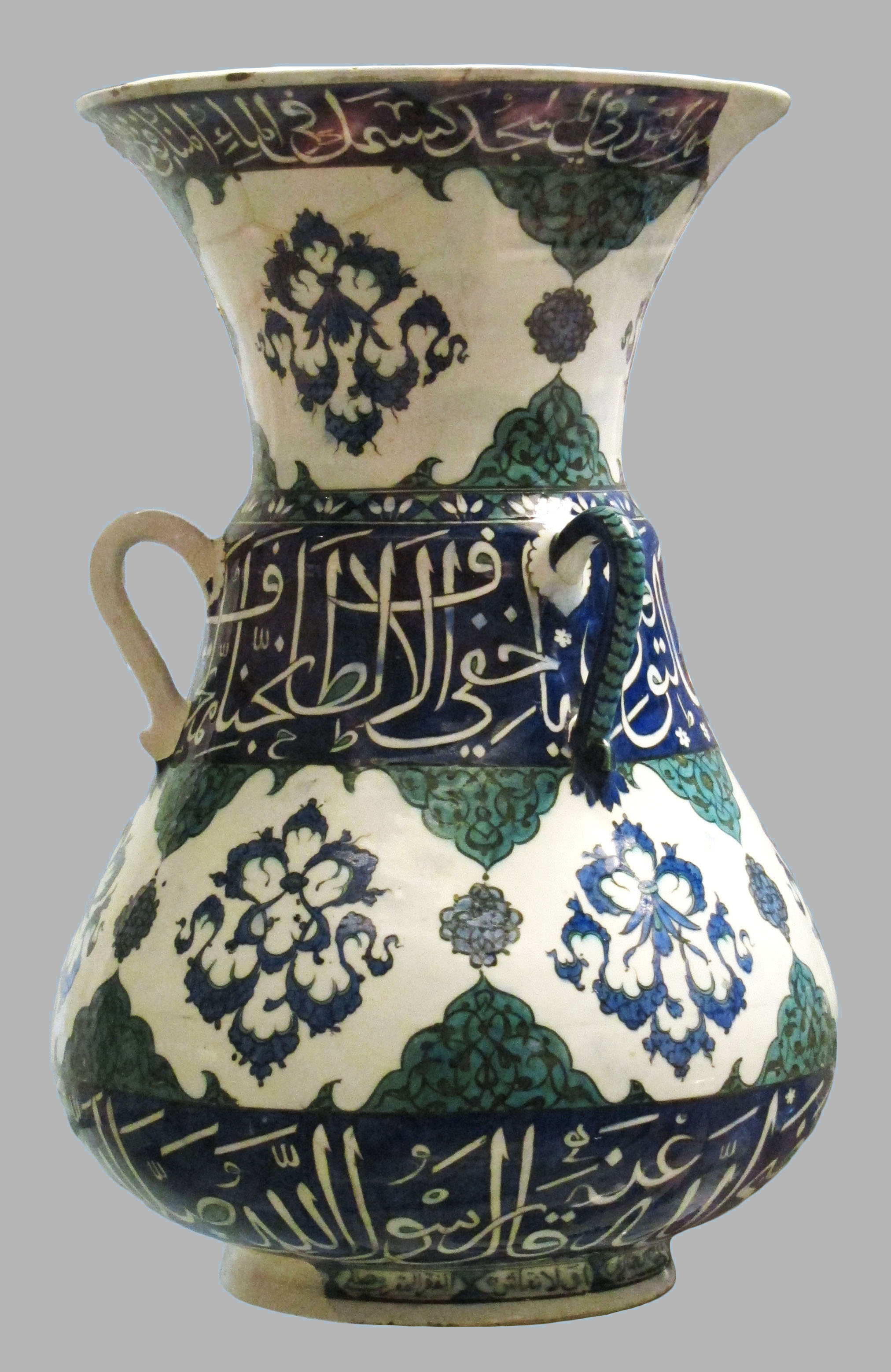
Mosque lamp, probably made for the Dome of the Rock in Jerusalem, dated 1549

The so-called 'Damascus ware' was popular under Süleyman the Magnificent from 1540 to 1555. Vessels were decorated for the first time with sage green and pale purple, in addition to cobalt blue and turquoise, and form a transition towards full-fledged polychrome ceramics. They were mistakenly believed to have originated from Damascus by art collectors in the second half of the 19th century. The name is particular misleading as tiles with a similar palette of pastel colours and floral designs were made in Damascus from the second half of the 16th century.

A key object from this period is a ceramic vessel in the form of a mosque lamp with an inscribed date that is now in the British Museum. It is the best documented surviving piece of Iznik pottery and enables scholars to fix the dates and provenance of other objects. The lamp was discovered on the Temple Mount in Jerusalem in the middle of the 19th century and is believed to have been associated with the refurbishment of the Dome of the Rock initiated by Suleiman the Magnificent. Around the base of the lamp are a series of inscribed cartouches giving the name of the decorator (Musli), a dedication to the İznik Sufi saint Eşrefzâde Rumi, and the date of AH 956 in the month of Jumada'l-Ula (AD 1549). The lamp is decorated in green, black and two shades of blue. The design includes pale blue cloud-banks, small-scale arabesques on a green ground and a row of tulip buds in dark-blue cartouches. The lamp can be used to date a group of other vessels including some large footed basins. Although the basins are quite different from the lamp in overall style, each basin shares motifs present on the lamp. (Note: A spherical hanging ornament with similar decorative motifs to those on the Dome of the Rock mosque lamp is now in the Benaki Museum in Athens. The museum inventory number is ΓΕ 9.)

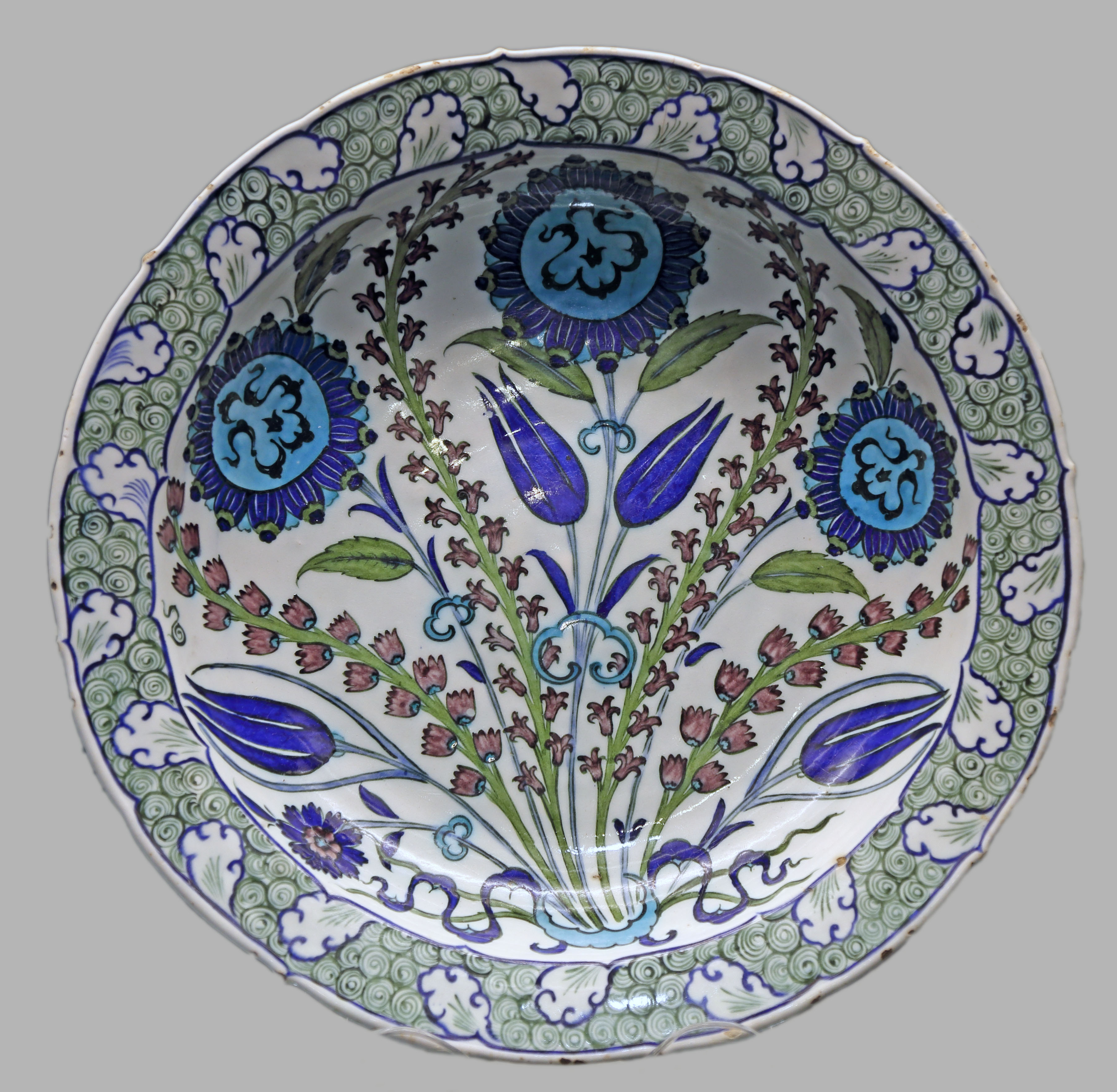
Dish with cloud scrolls that are similar to those on the lamp, and a rock and wave border, c. 1550

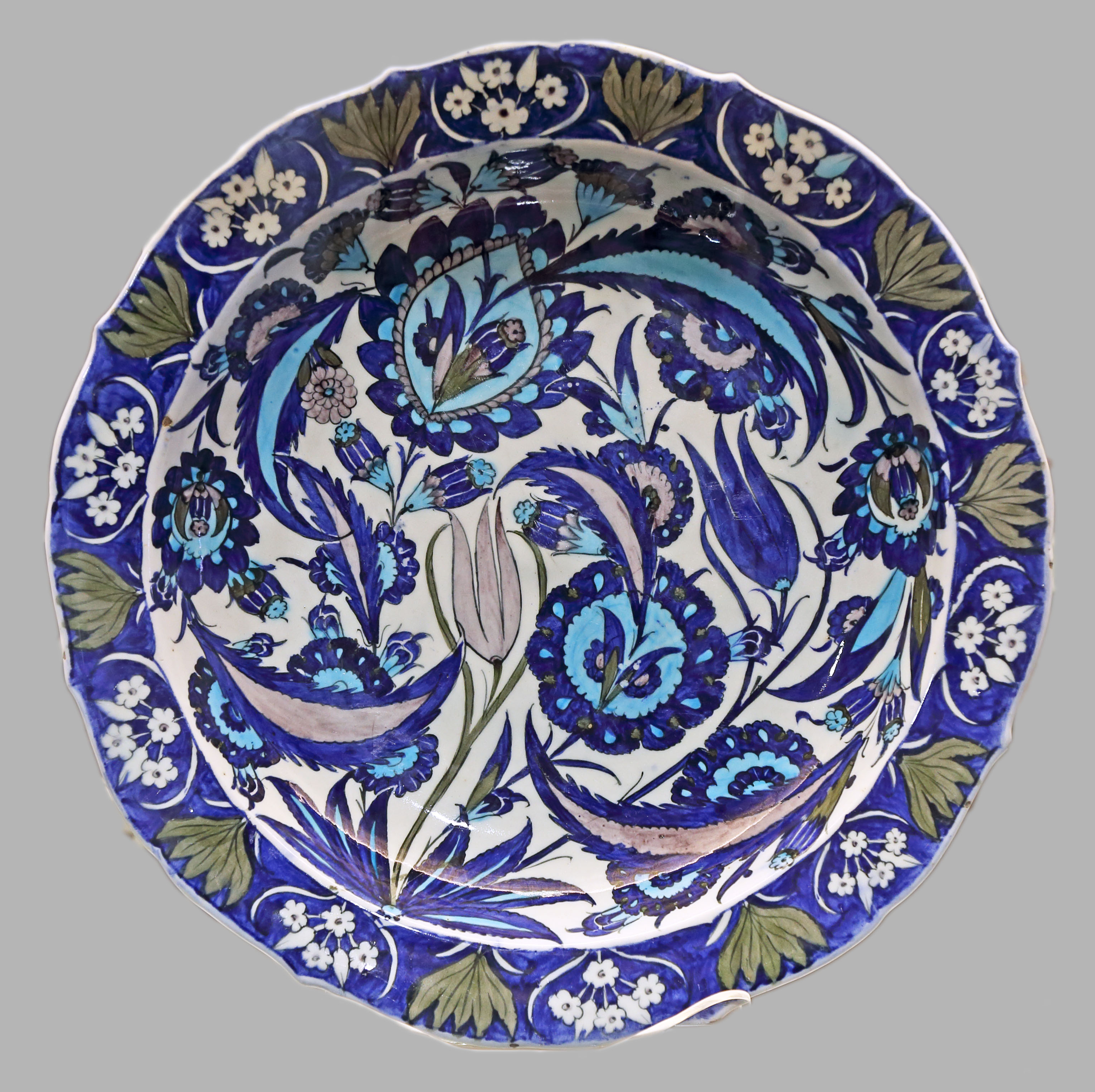
Dish with saz leaves and flowers, c. 1545–1550

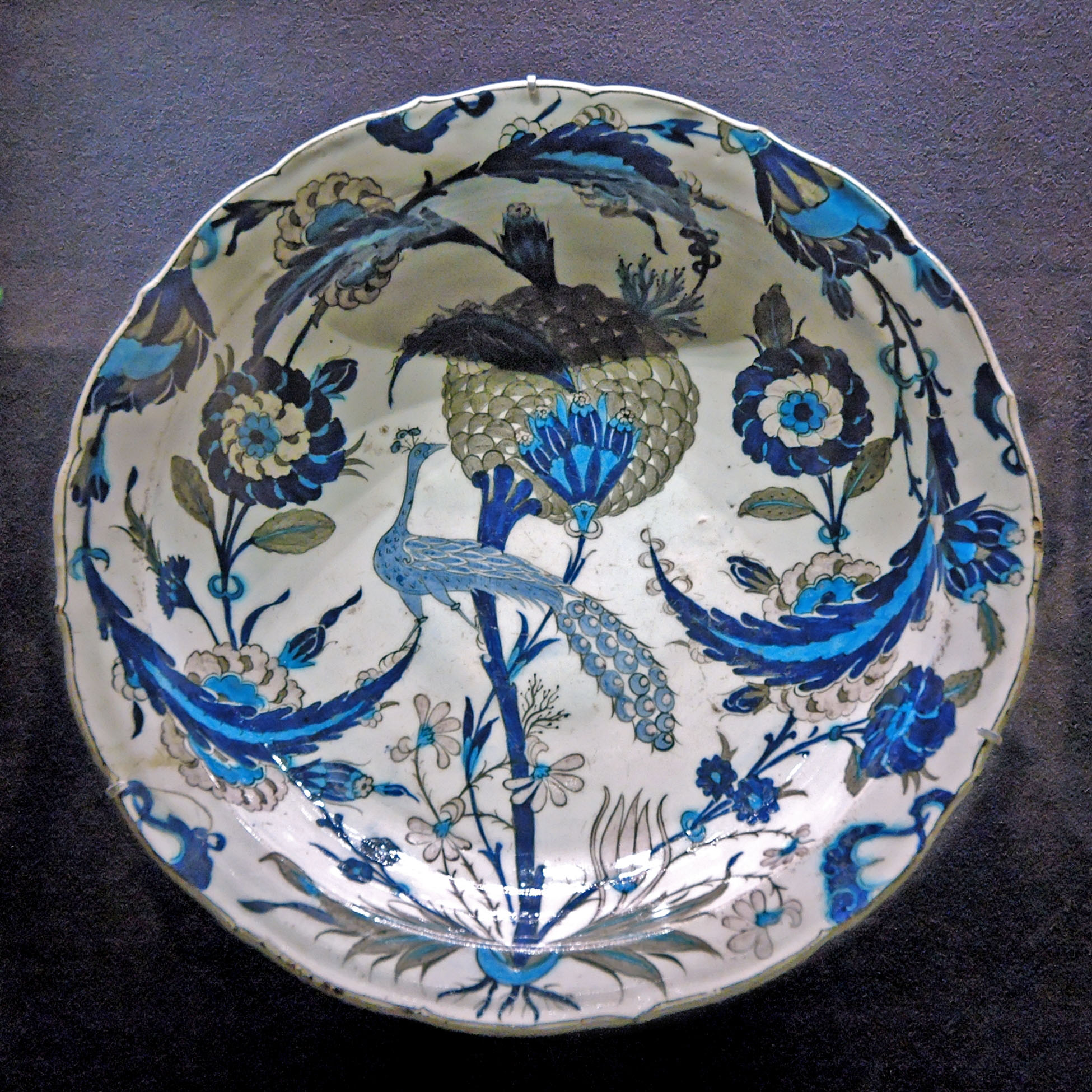
Dish covered with rosettes, saz leaves and a peacock, c. 1540–1555

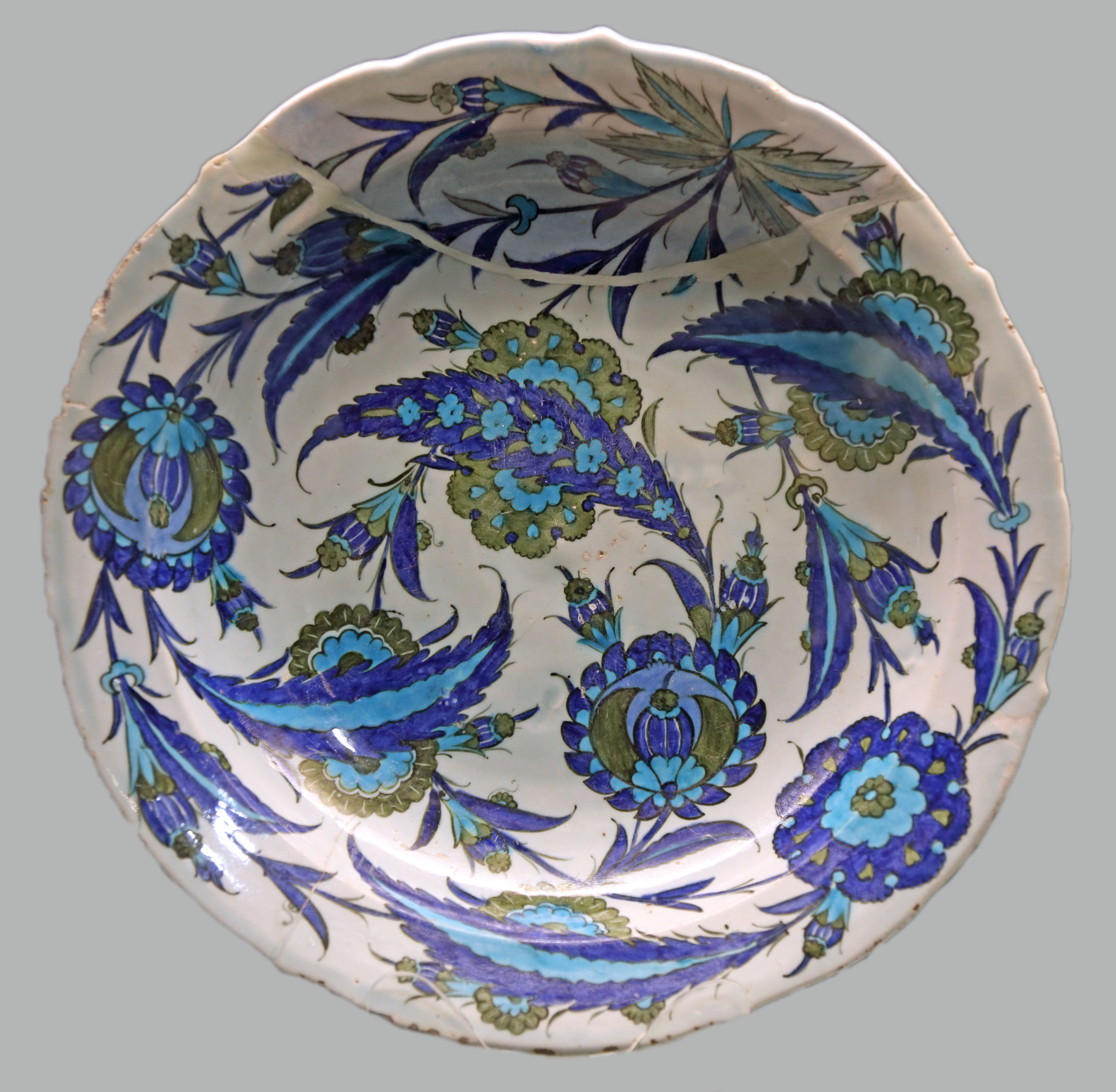
Dish covered with rosettes and saz leaves, c. 1545–1550

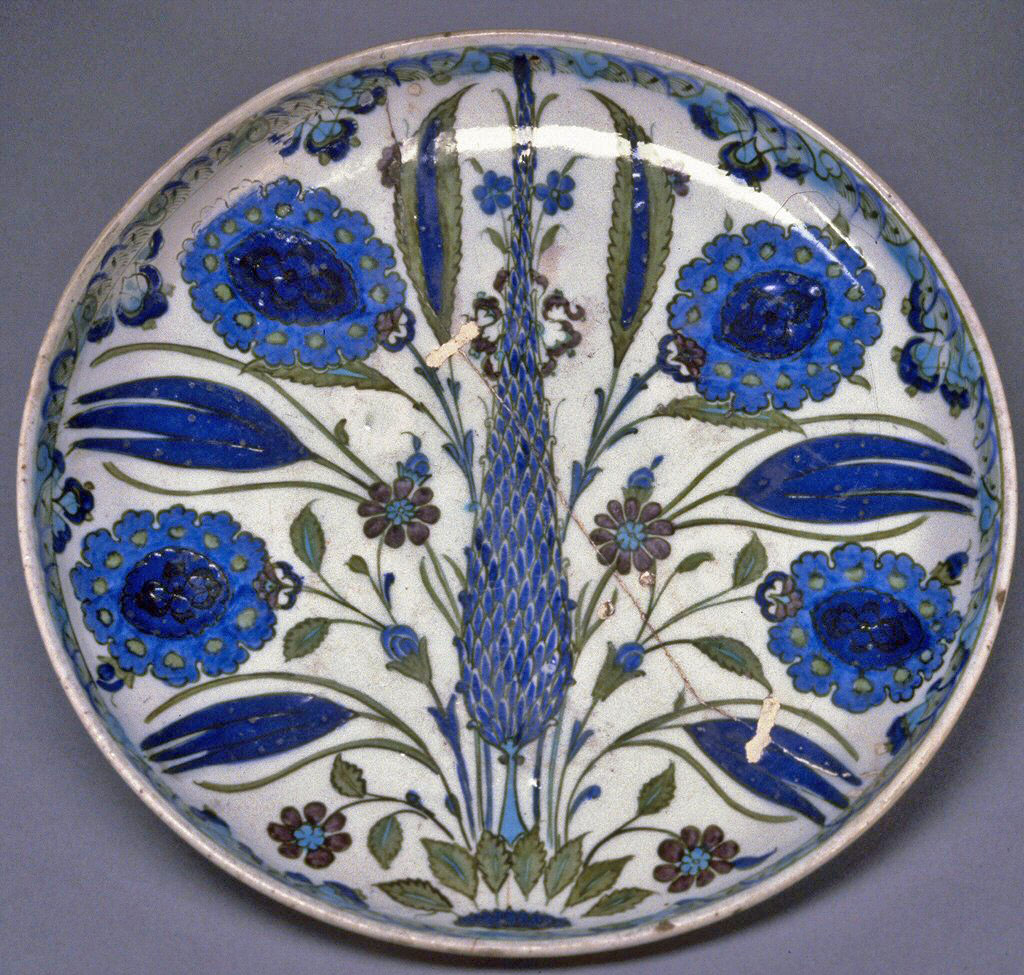
Rimless shallow dish with flowers and a cypress, c. 1525–1550

There are only two surviving buildings with tiles that use the purple colour scheme. The earliest is the Yeni Kaplıca bathhouse in Bursa where the walls are covered with hexagonal tiles set on their points. The tiles are decorated with arabesques and floral motifs painted in blue, turquoise, olive green and purple. There are nine different designs. The tiles were originally installed in a different building but were transferred to the Yeni Kaplıca bathhouse when it was restored by the grand vizier Rüstem Pasha in 1552–1553. The tiles probably date from the late 1540s.

The other building is the Hadim Ibrahim Pasha Mosque at Silivrikapı in Istanbul which was designed by the imperial architect Mimar Sinan and completed in 1551. Under the portico on the north façade are three tiled lunette panels and two roundels. The panels have white thuluth lettering reserved on a dark cobalt blue background. Between the letters are flowers in purple and turquoise. Within the mosque above the mihrab is a large lunette panel with tiles painted in cobalt blue, turquoise and dark olive green.

== Polychrome ceramics (1560–1600) ==
=== Tiles ===
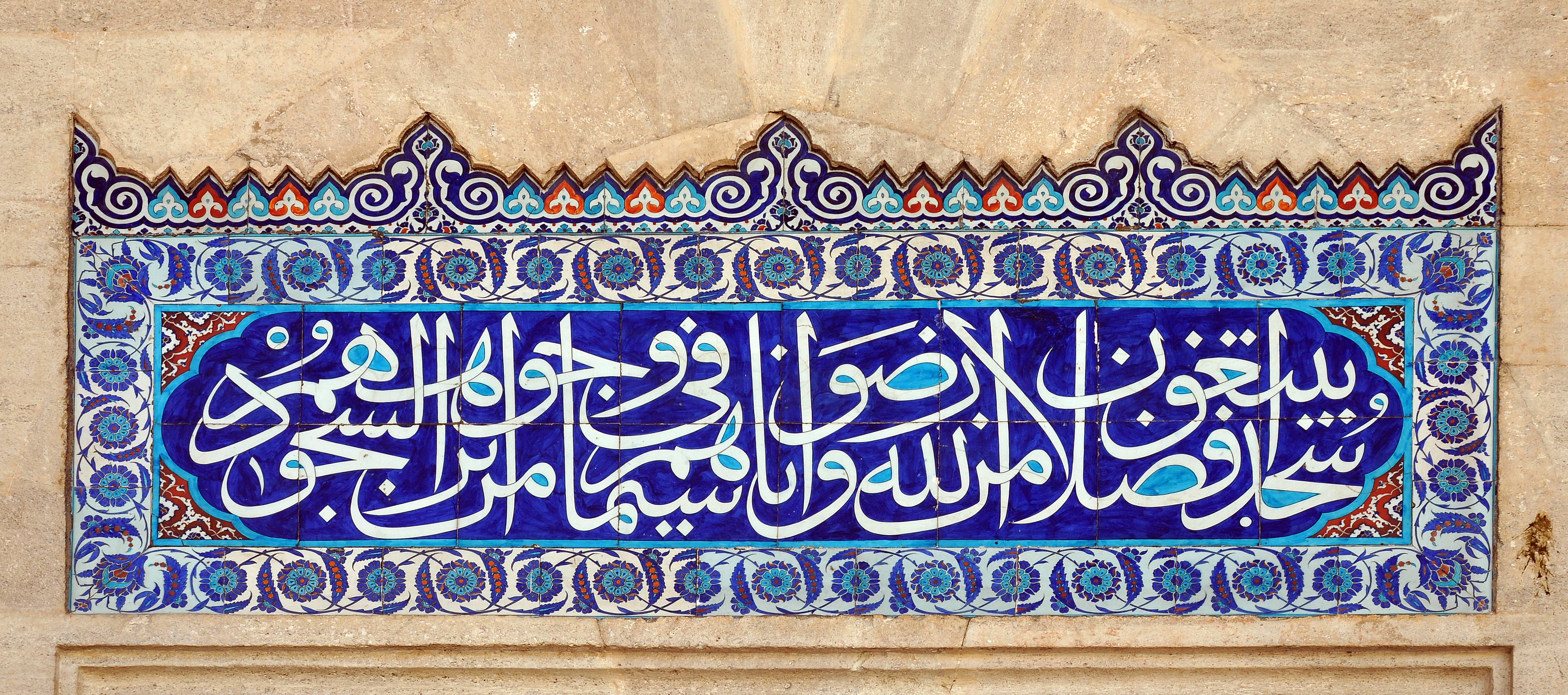
Tiled lunette panel decorated with bole red on the Süleymaniye Mosque, Istanbul, c. 1557

Beginning in the middle of the 16th century, the potters in Iznik began producing coloured fritware tiles to decorate the imperial buildings designed by the head architect Mimar Sinan. Exactly how this was organised is not known, but Sinan as architect was almost certainly involved in coordinating the design of the tilework with the architecture of the buildings.

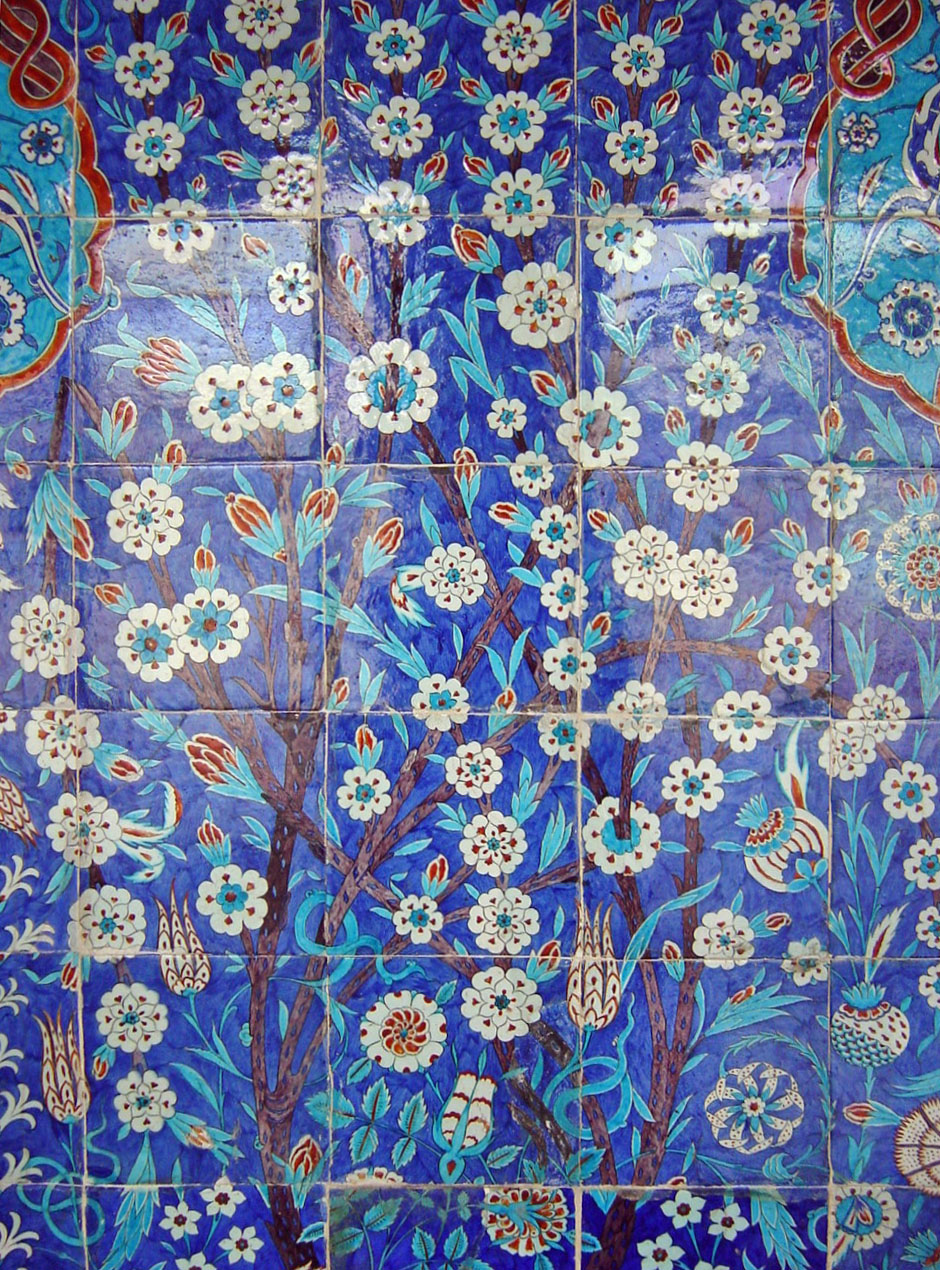
Tiled panel under the portico of the Rüstem Pasha Mosque in Istanbul, c. 1561

Large quantities of tiles were required. In the 1550s and early 1560s the potters in Iznik made tiles for the Süleymaniye Mosque in Istanbul, the mausoleum of Hurrem Sultan (Roxelana) (completed in 1558), the Great Mosque in Adana (in around 1560), (Note: The Great Mosque in Adana was an existing building and was not designed by Sinan.) the Rüstem Pasha Mosque in Istanbul (completed in around 1563), and the mausoleum of Süleyman I (completed in 1567). The mausoleums of Süleyman I and that of his wife Hurrem Sultan are both located in the grounds of the Süleymaniye Mosque in Istanbul.

Associated with this switch to tile production were important changes in the aesthetics. A bright red colour was introduced by the use of an iron containing bole applied as slip under the glaze. The red colour would become a common feature of Iznik tiles and pottery. The first building to have tiles with red was the Süleymaniye Mosque in Istanbul which was designed by the imperial architect Mimar Sinan and completed in 1557. The tile decoration inside the mosque is restricted to around the mihrab on the qibla wall. The repeating rectangular tiles have a stencil-like floral pattern on a white ground. The flowers are mainly blue but there is also turquoise, black and red. Outside the mosque on the north facade within the courtyard the windows have rectangular Iznik tile lunettes panels with text from the Quran. The white letters are written in thuluth script on a dark blue ground. The decoration on these tiles also includes the bole red.

The next major monument designed by Sinan was the Rüstem Pasha Mosque which was completed in 1563. In contrast to the restrained use of tiles in the Süleymaniye Mosque, the surfaces in the interior and the façade under the portico at the entrance are all lavishly decorated with tiles. More than 80 different designs are used. Most of the tiles are in panels of repetitive patterns where each tile is identical to the others. The mosque is the first with the Kara Memi inspired red tulips and carnations. The mihrab is decorated with tiles painted with a thin brownish red but in other parts of the mosque there are tiles with the thick sealing-wax red relief. The purple used on 'Damascus ware' did not combine well the red bole and only a few monuments use both colours. Purple is used with red in the tiled panel depicting flowering prunus under the portico to the left of the entrance of Rüstem Pasha Mosque in Istanbul.

'Damascus ware' used a sage-green - a green with a greyish tone. This colour was used sparingly on the tiles of the mausoleum of Hurrem Sultan (Roxelana) (1558) but no green was used on the tiles of the Great Mosque in Adana (c. 1560) nor on the mausoleum of Rüstem Pasha (1562). With the exception of a tiled panel above an external doorway which was added at later date, none of the tiles in the Rustem Pasha Mosque include green in their decoration. The bright emerald green was introduced for the first time on the portico panels of Süleyman's mausoleum in the funerary garden of the Süleymaniye complex, which was completed in 1567.

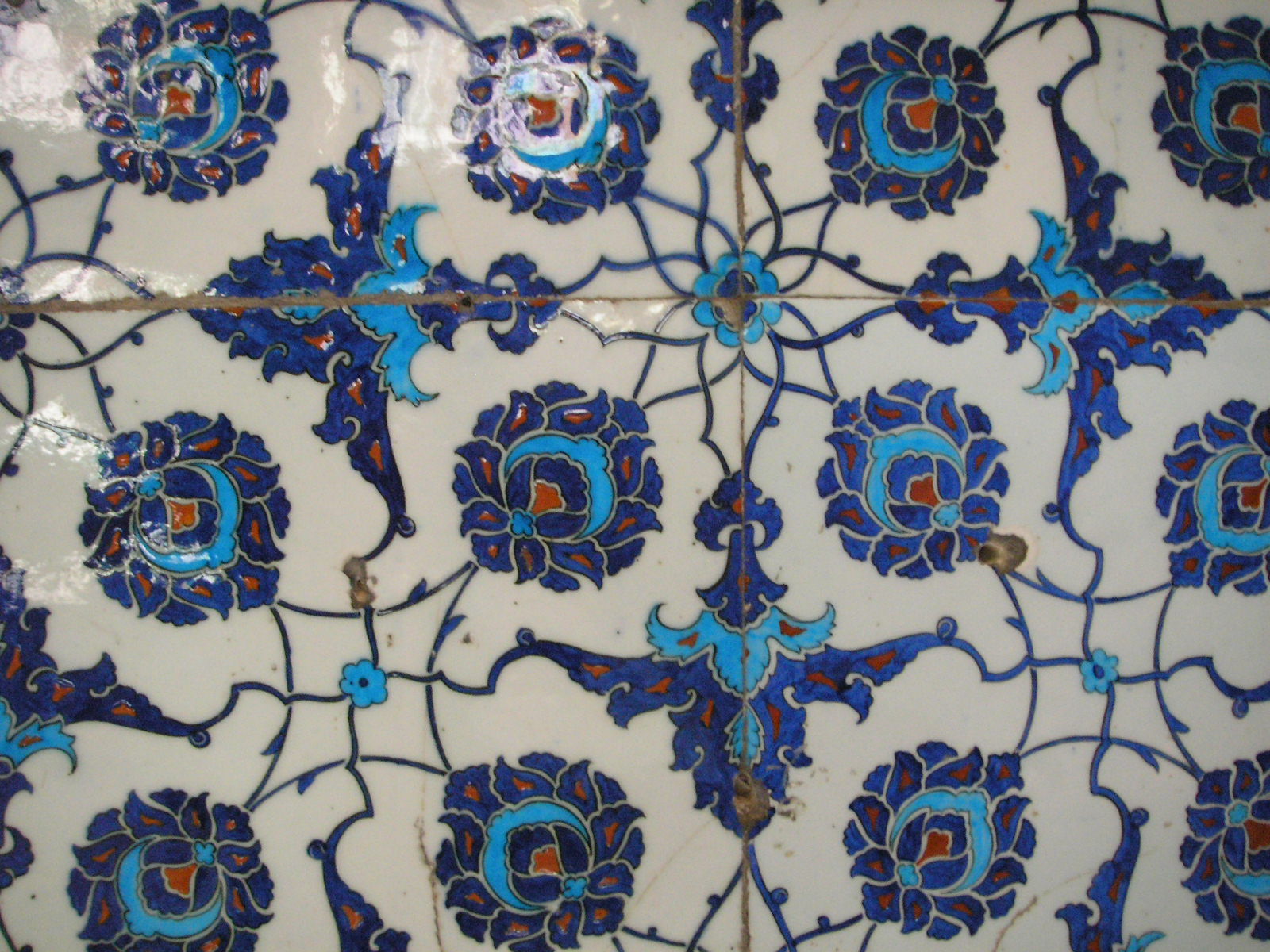
Iznik tiles in the Neo-classical Enderûn Library in the Topkapı Palace

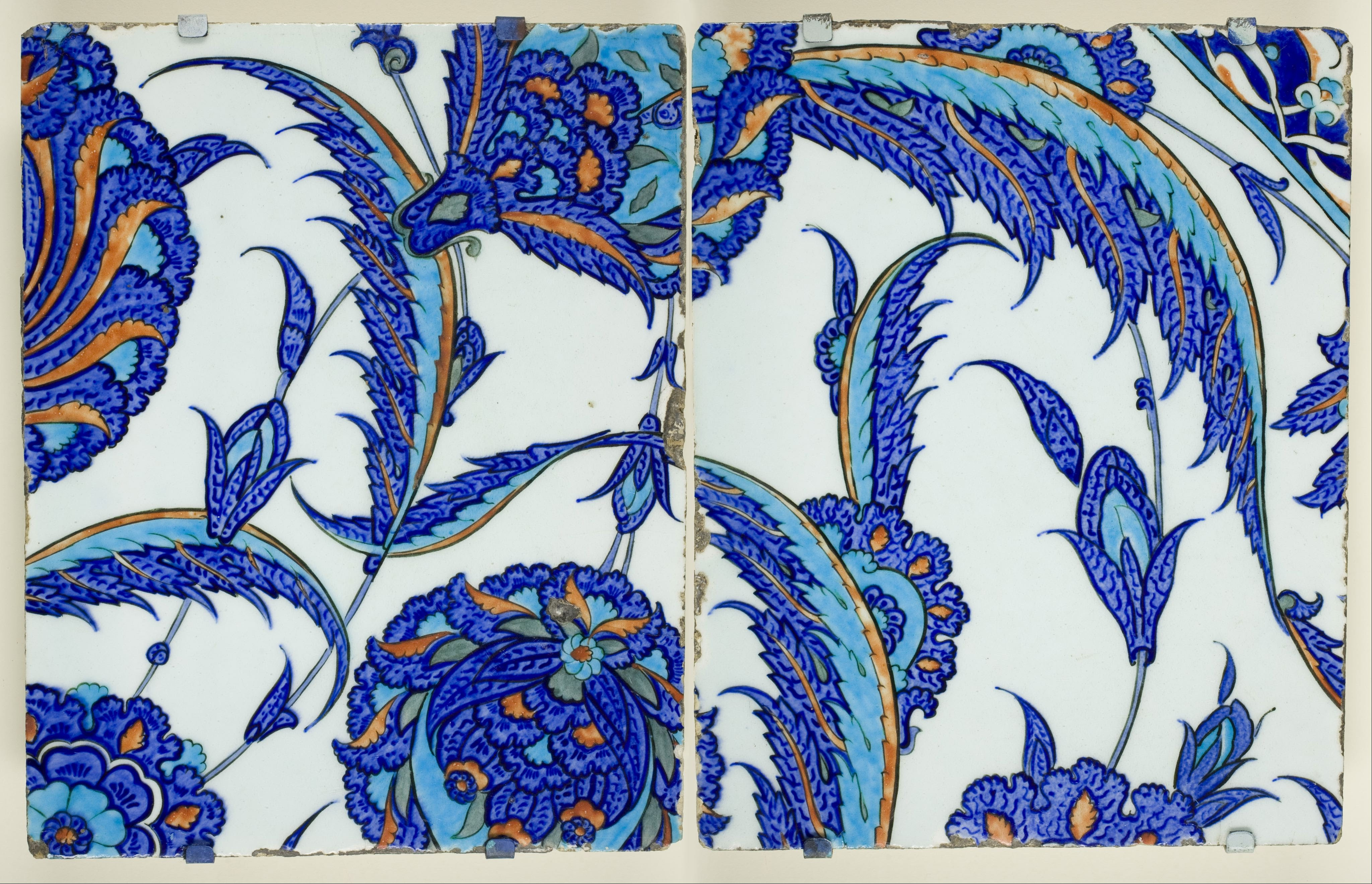
Two tiles, c. 1560

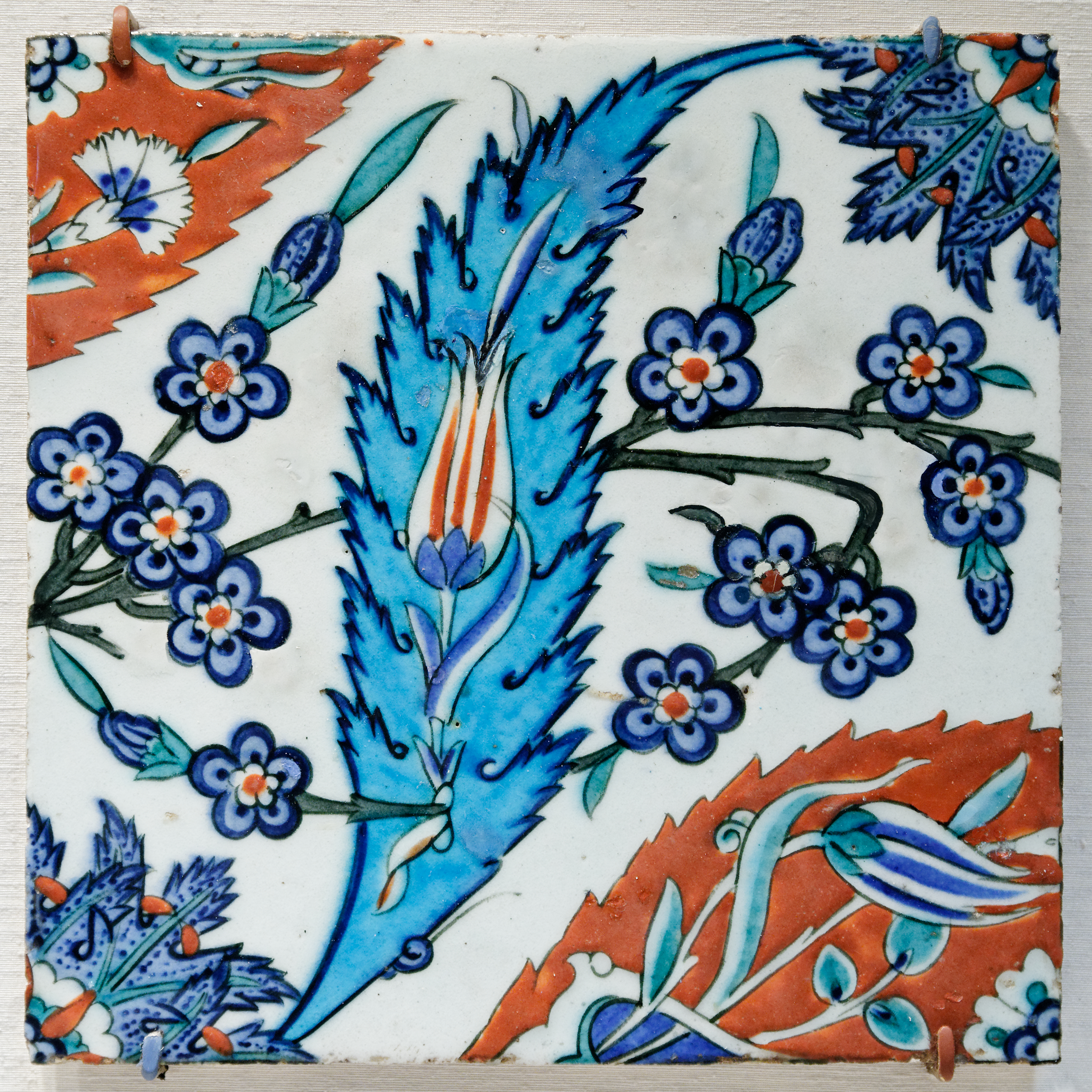
Tile with saz leaves, tulips and prunus flowers, third quarter 16th century

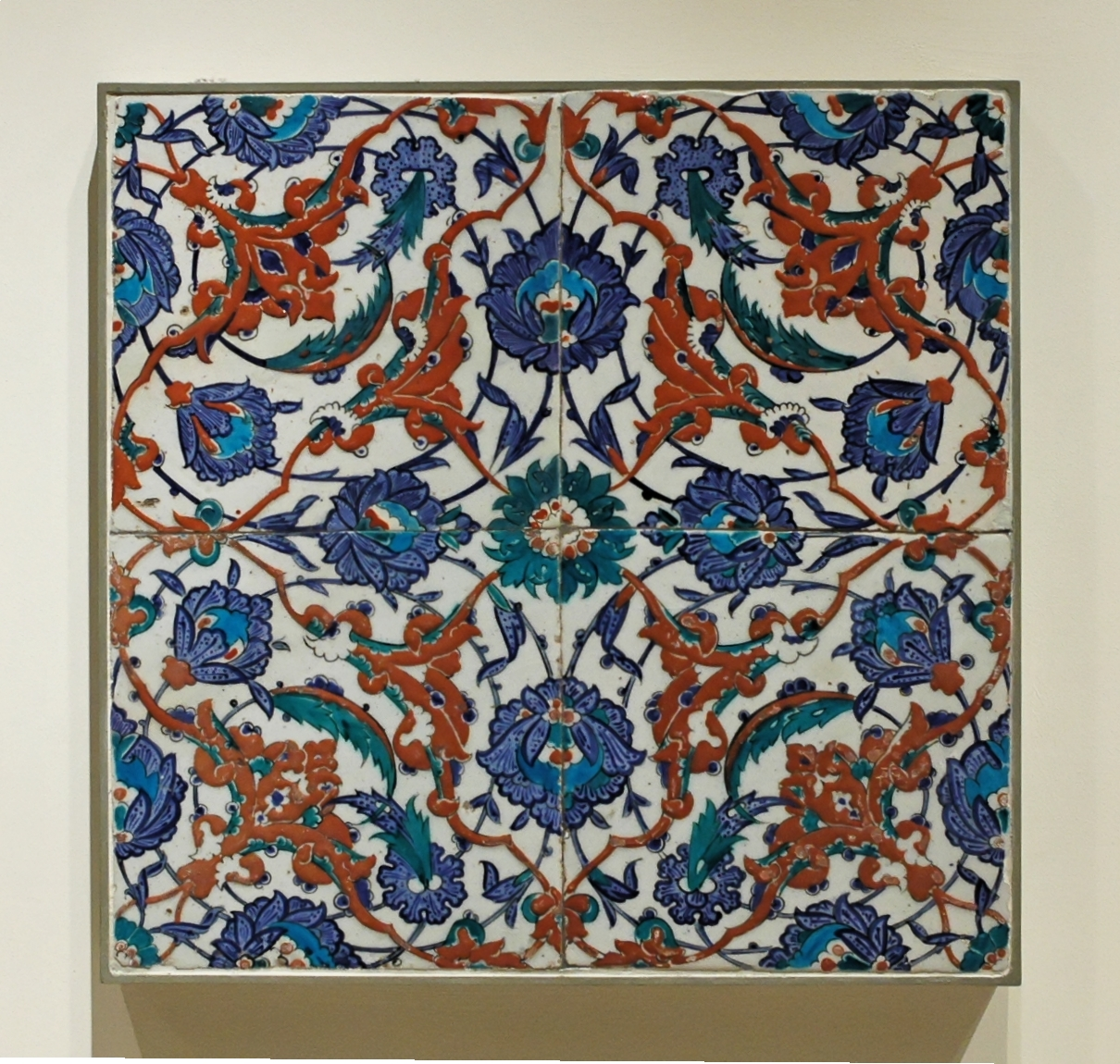
Tile panel, second half 16th century

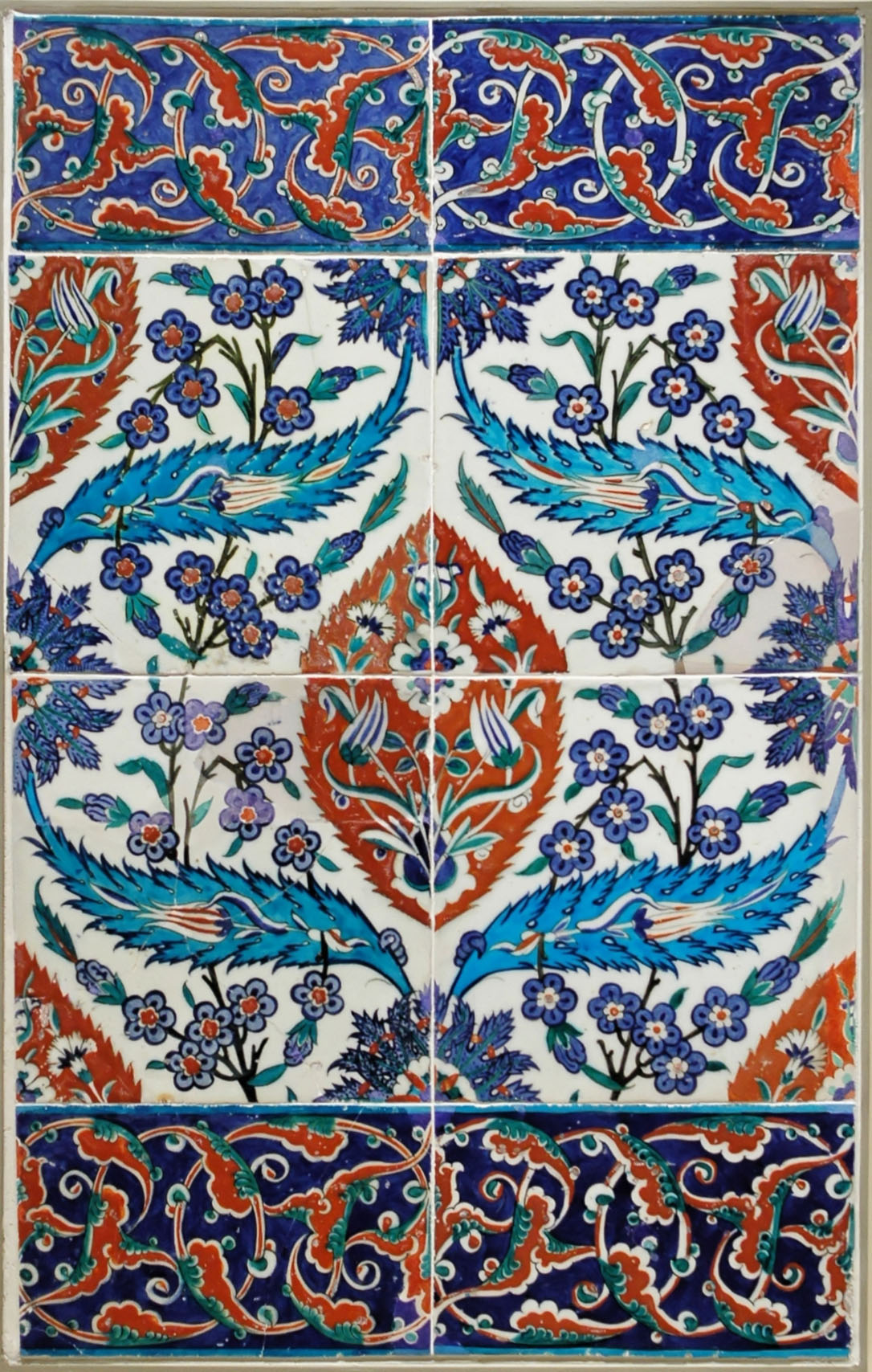
Tiled panel with a central mandorla, c. 1580

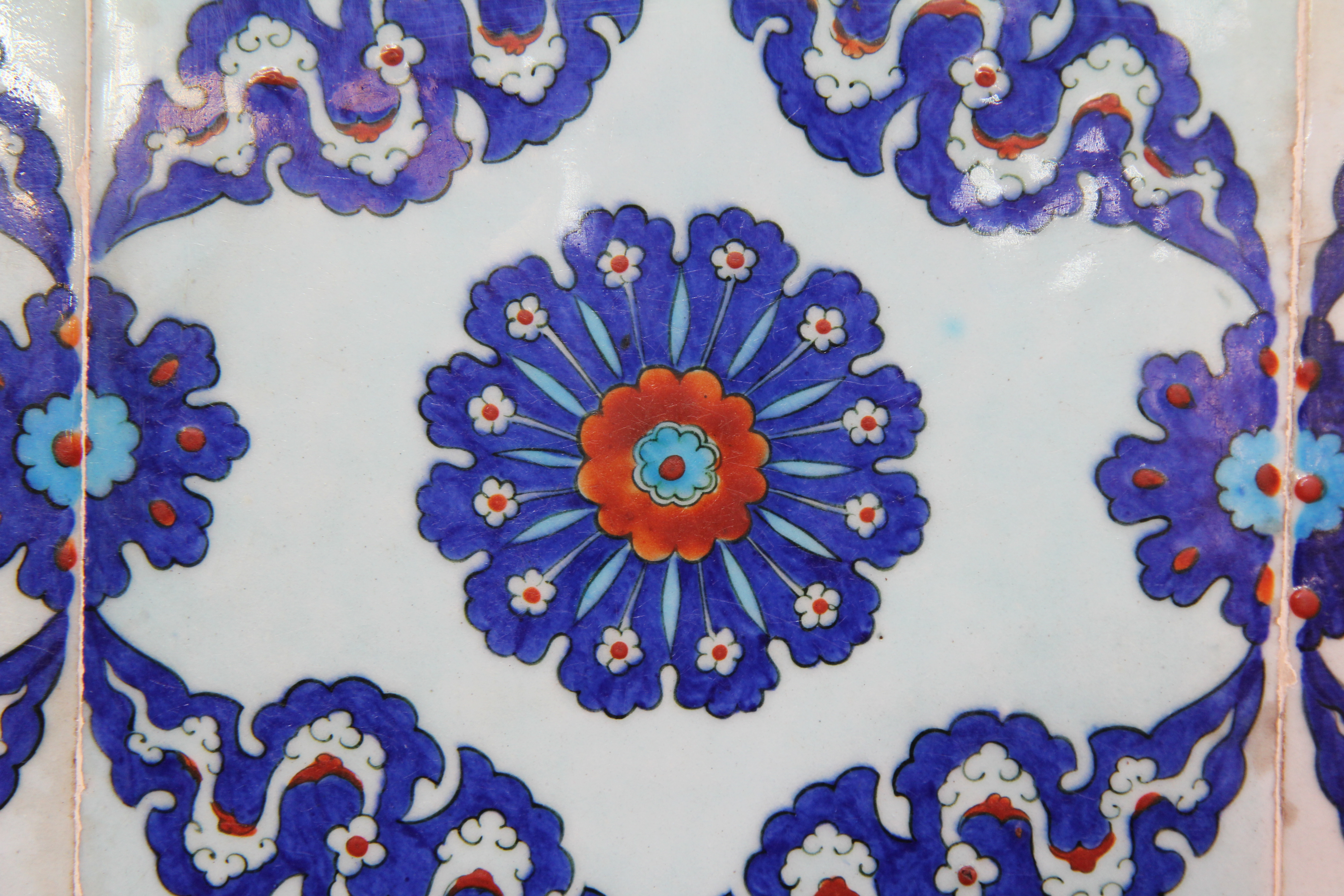
Detail of a tile in the Rüstem Pasha Mosque, c. 1563

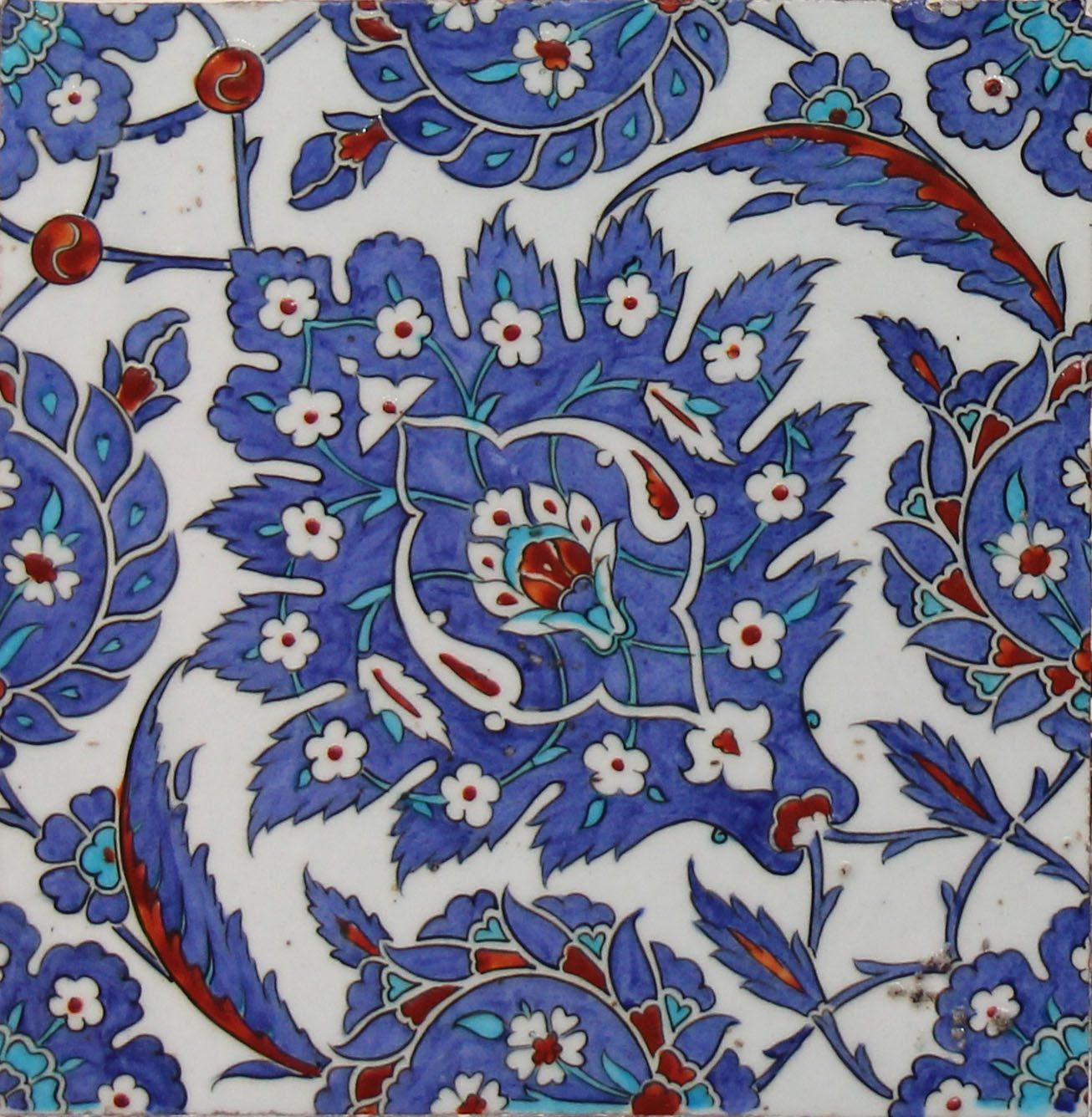
Wall tile in the Rüstem Pasha Mosque, c. 1563

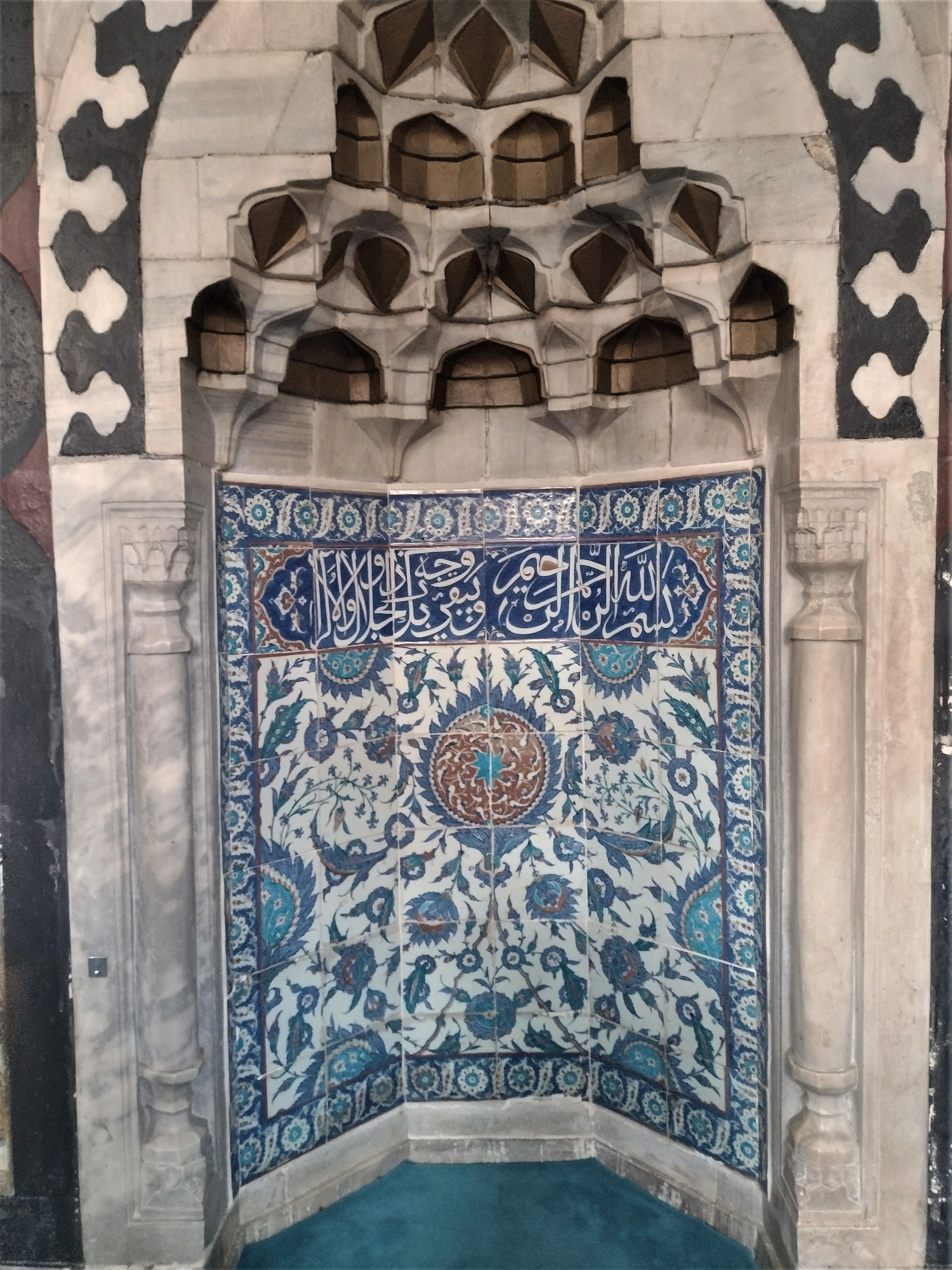
Tile in the Mihrab of the Great Mosque of Adana, c. 1560

== Pottery ==
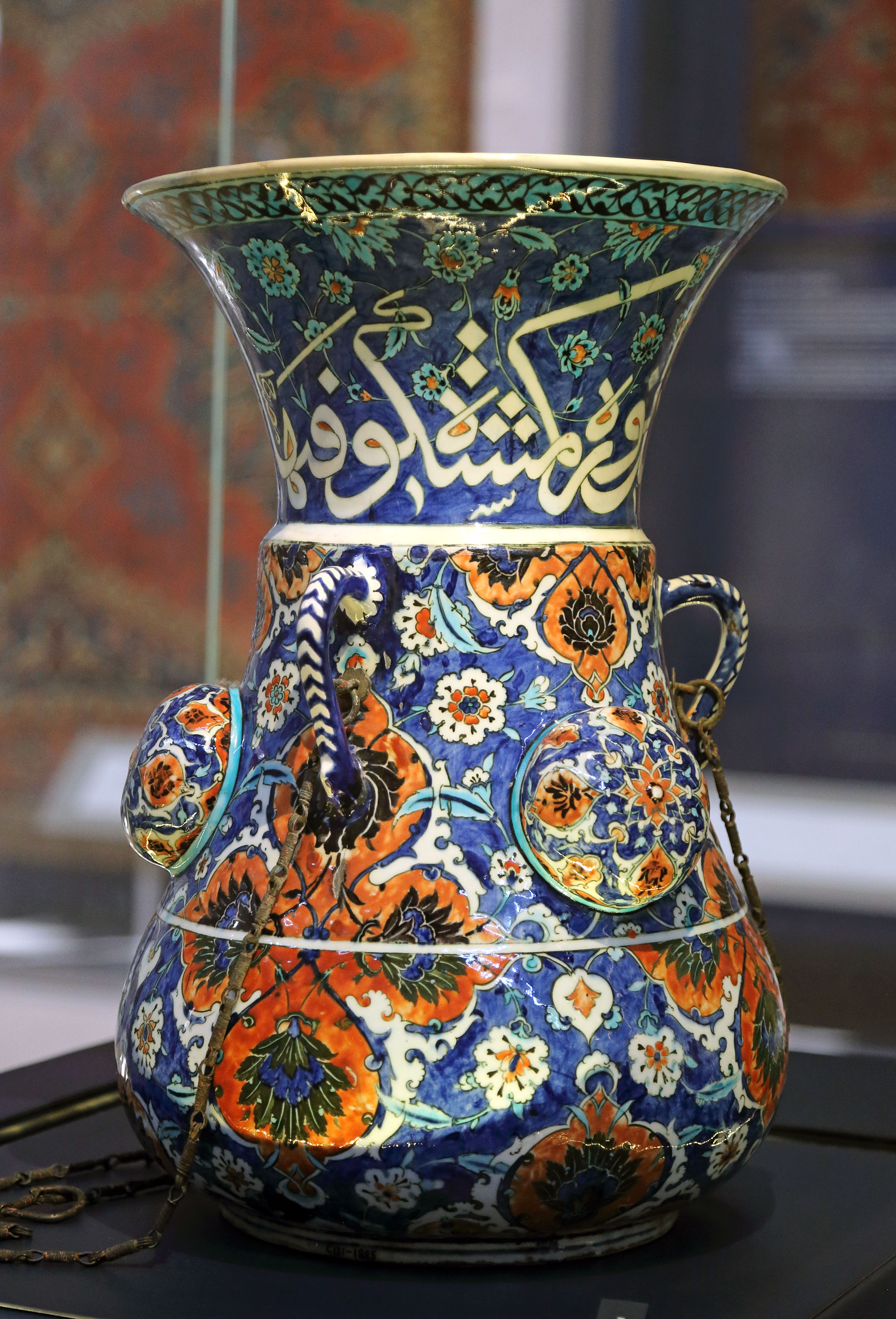
Lamp from the Süleymaniye Mosque c. 1557

An important object in the study of Iznik pottery is a mosque lamp that is now in the Victoria and Albert Museum in London. (Note: The Süleymaniye Mosque lamp in the Victoria and Albert Museum has the Inventory number: 131–1885) The lamp is believed to have made for the Süleymaniye Mosque in Istanbul which was completed in 1557. The lamp is the earliest object of a known date with the bole-red decoration that was to become a characteristic feature of Iznik tiles and pottery. The red on the lamp is thin, brownish and uneven. A few surviving dishes that use a similar thin red colouring are believed to date from the same period.

There are no surviving vessels with a date between that of the Dome of the Rock mosque lamp of 1549 until 1606/7. (Note: A dish now in the Musée National de la Renaissance in Écouen has the date written on the back as AH [10]15 which corresponds to AD 1606/7.) Many Iznik tiles survive on buildings of known date and although the designs generally differs from those used on pottery, it is often possible to determine an approximate date of a vessel by comparing the composition and motifs with those on tiles.

=== Dishes ===
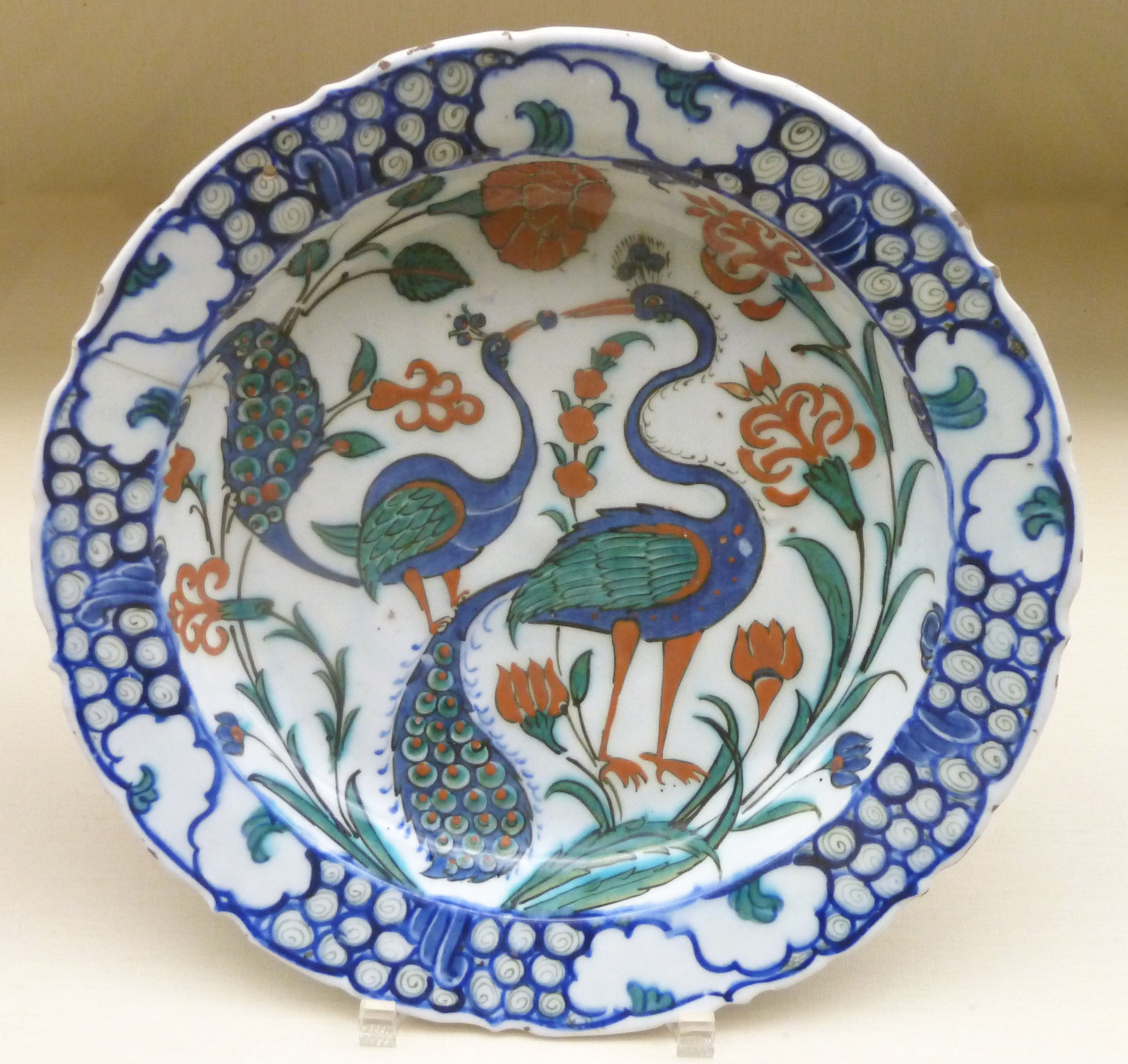
Dish with peacocks and flowers, c. 1575

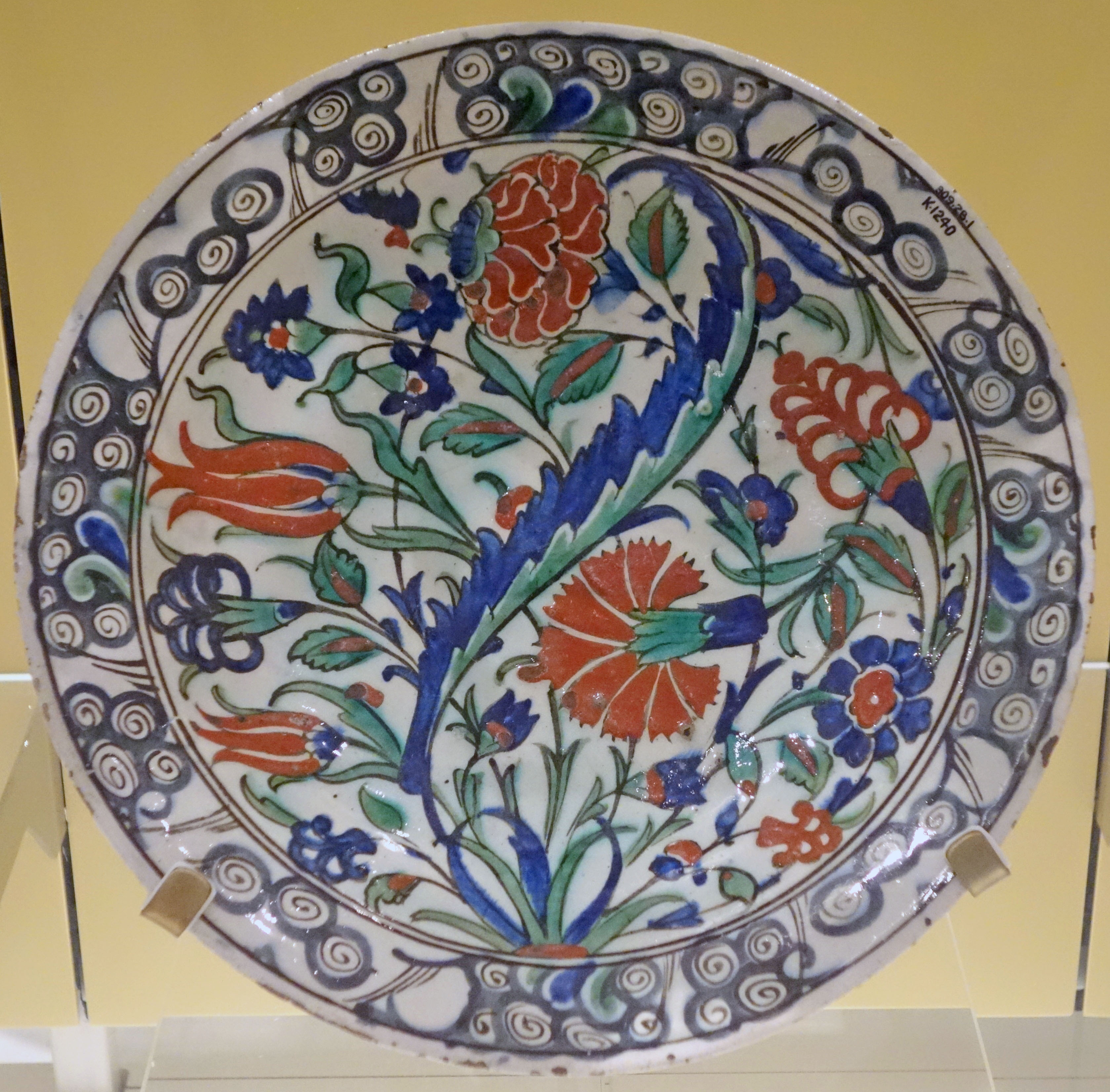
Dish with a saz leaf and flowers, c. 1575

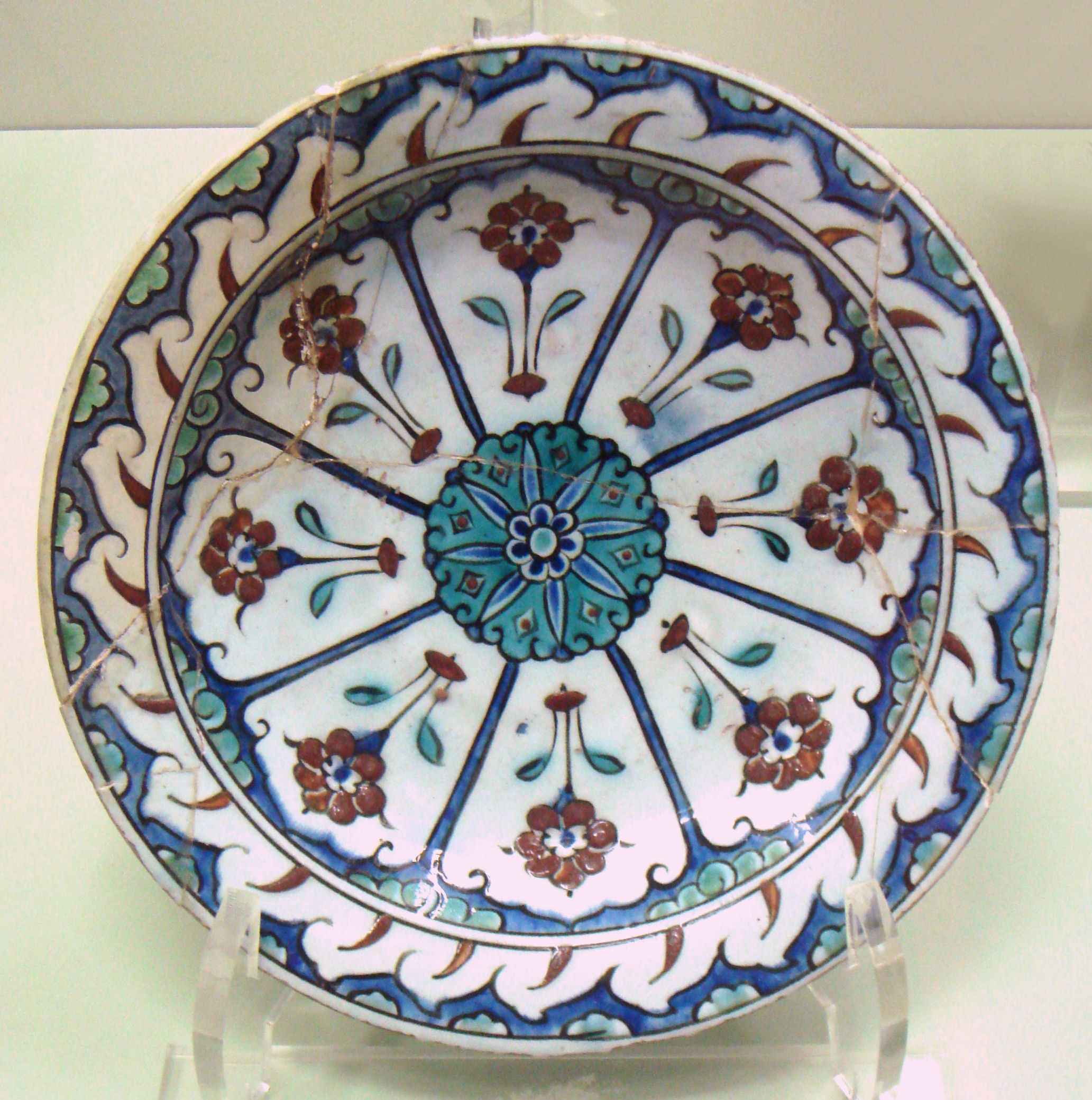
Dish with plain rim, late 16th – early 17th century

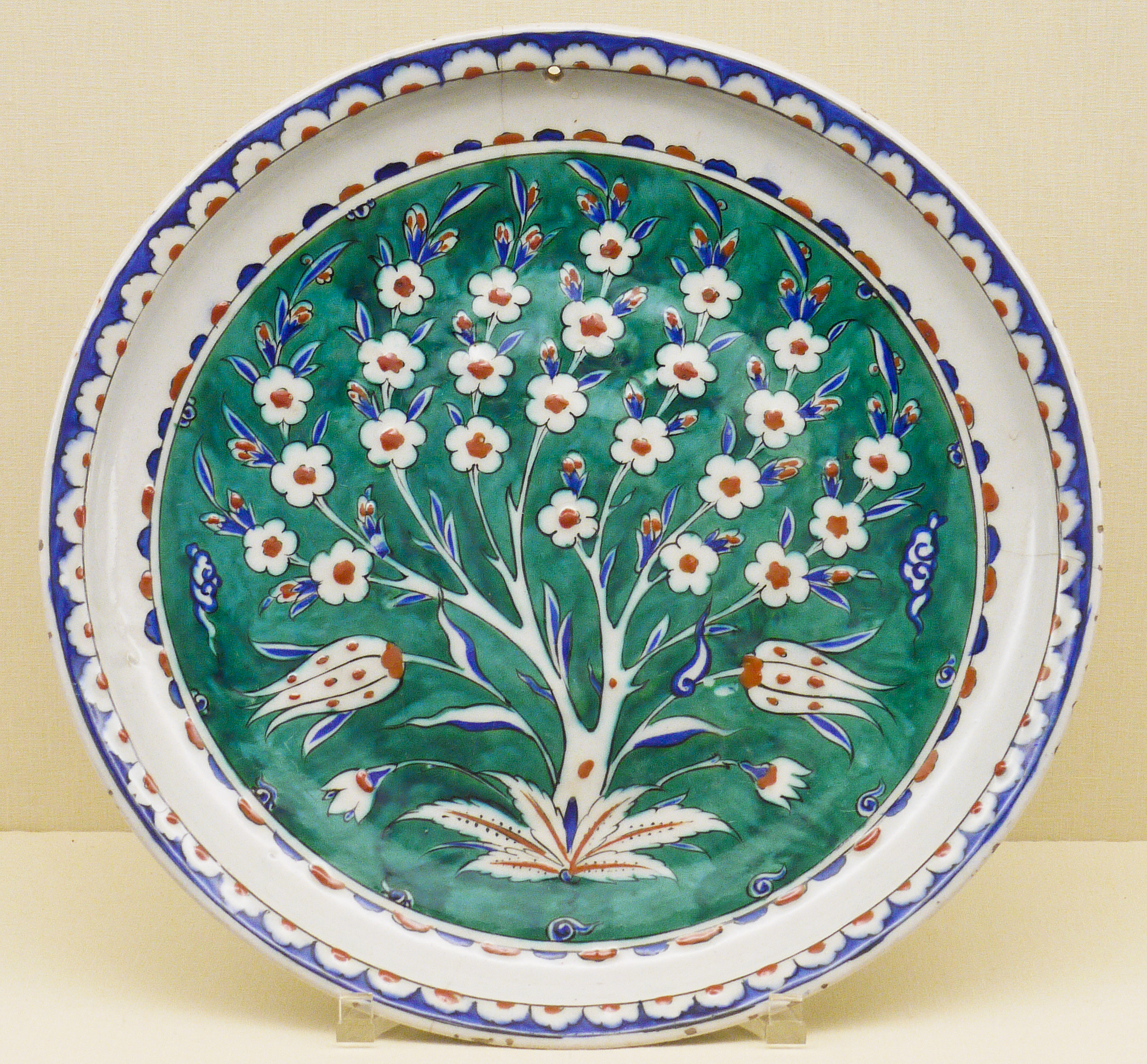
Dish with a prunus tree reserved in white on a green ground, c. 1585

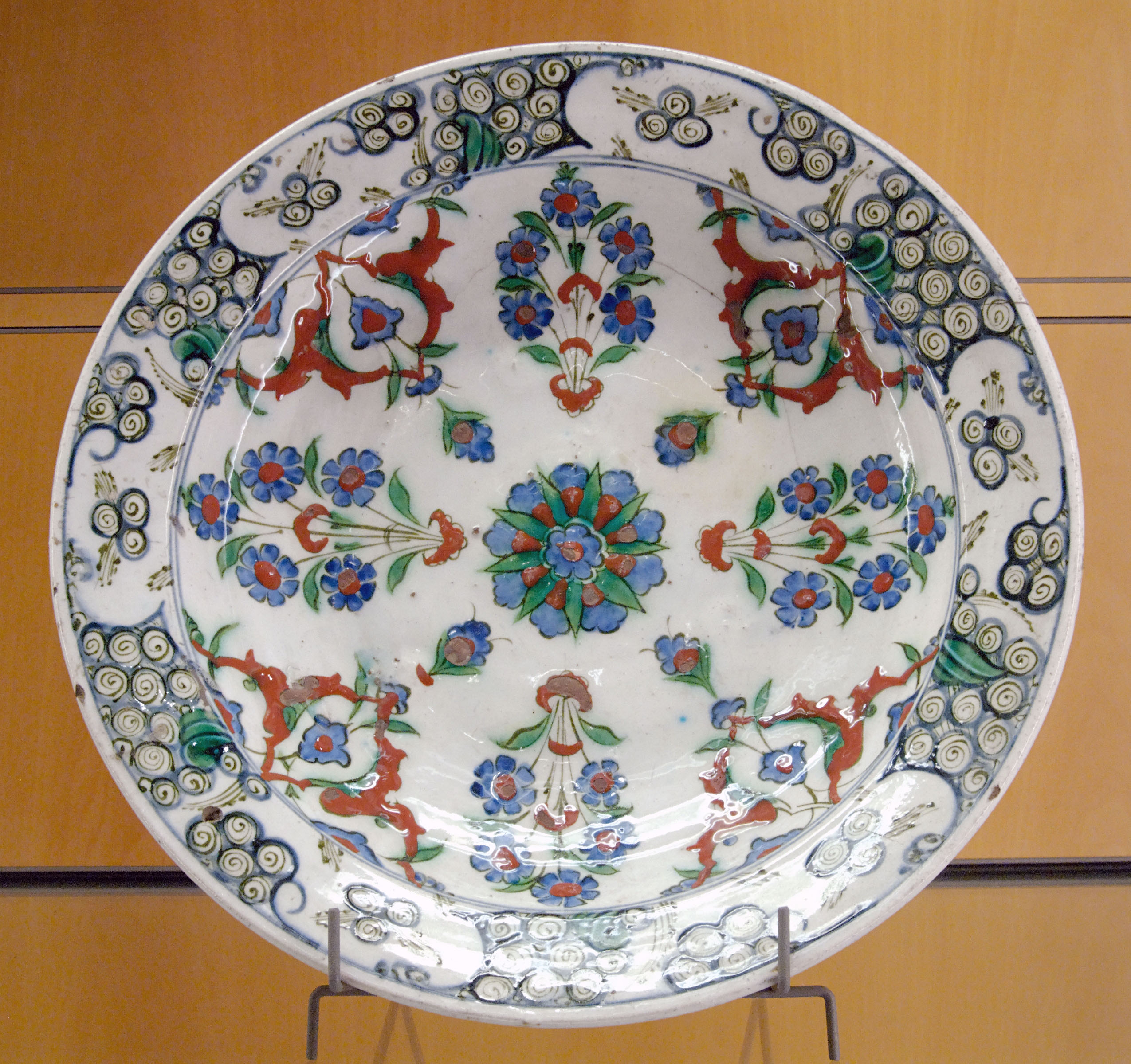
Dish with plain rim, 1580–1600

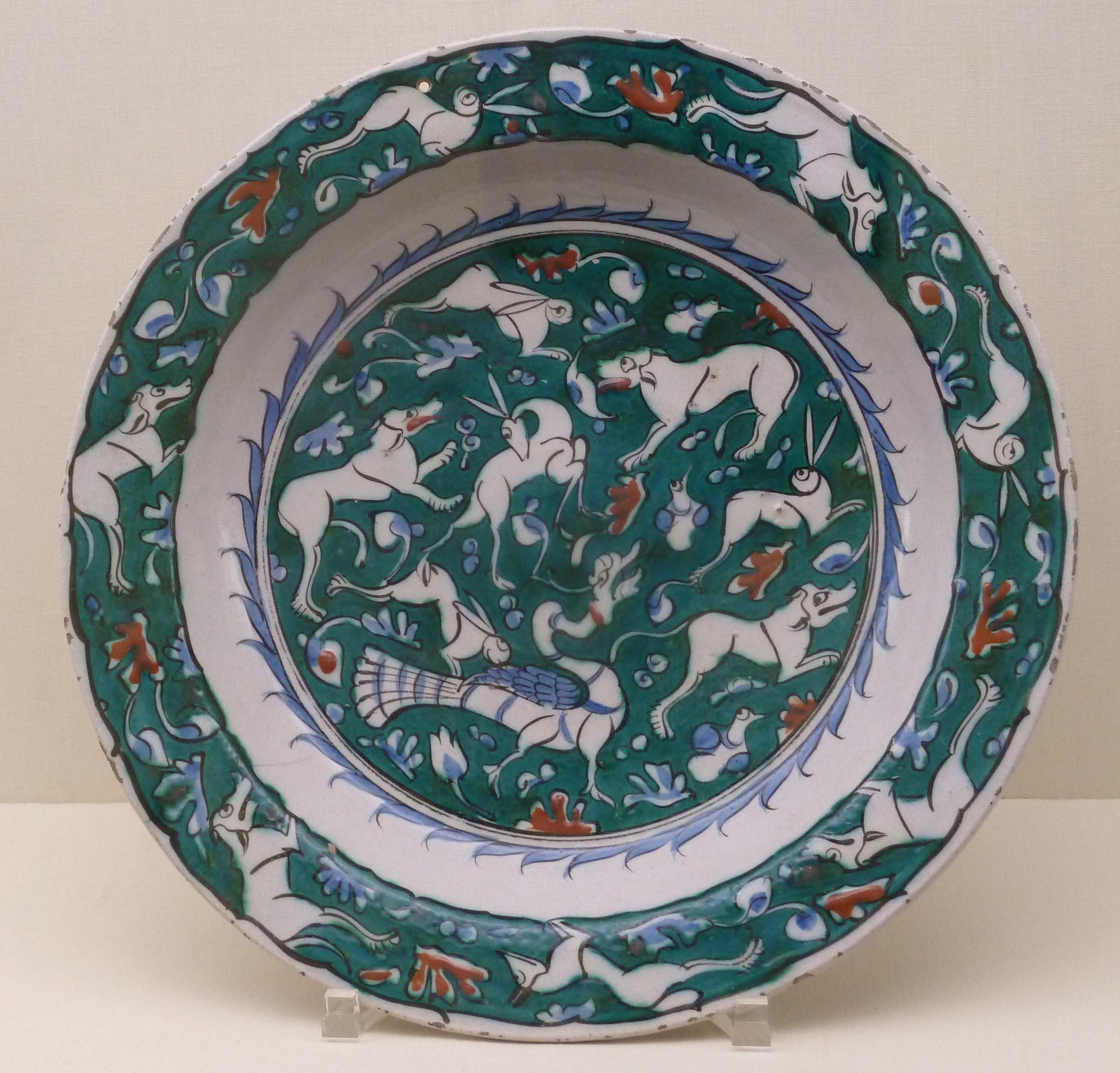
Dish with animals in reserve on a green background, c. 1580–1585

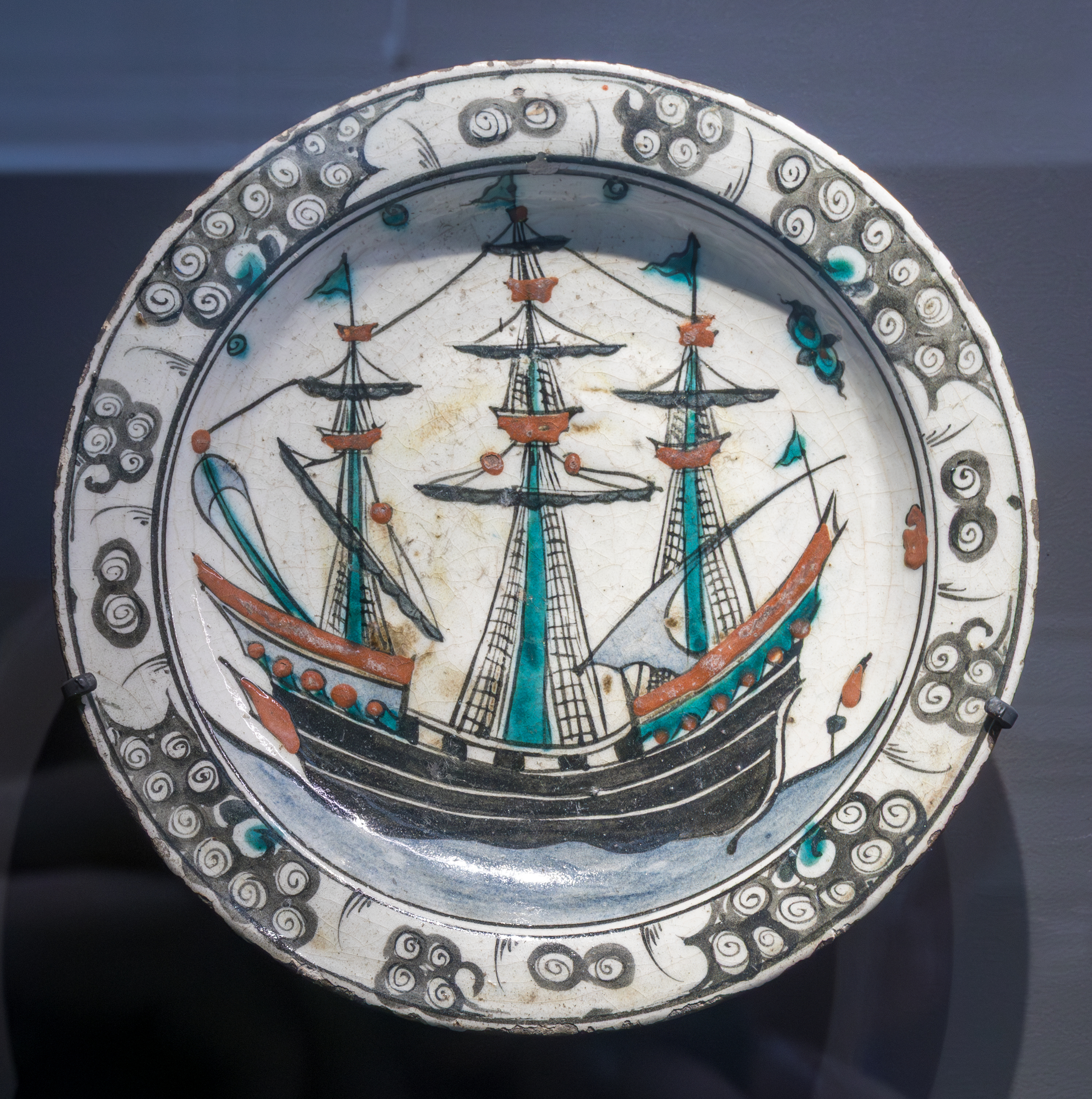
Boat and fish decoration plate (c. 1560), National Museum of the Renaissance of Ecouen.

=== Other objects ===
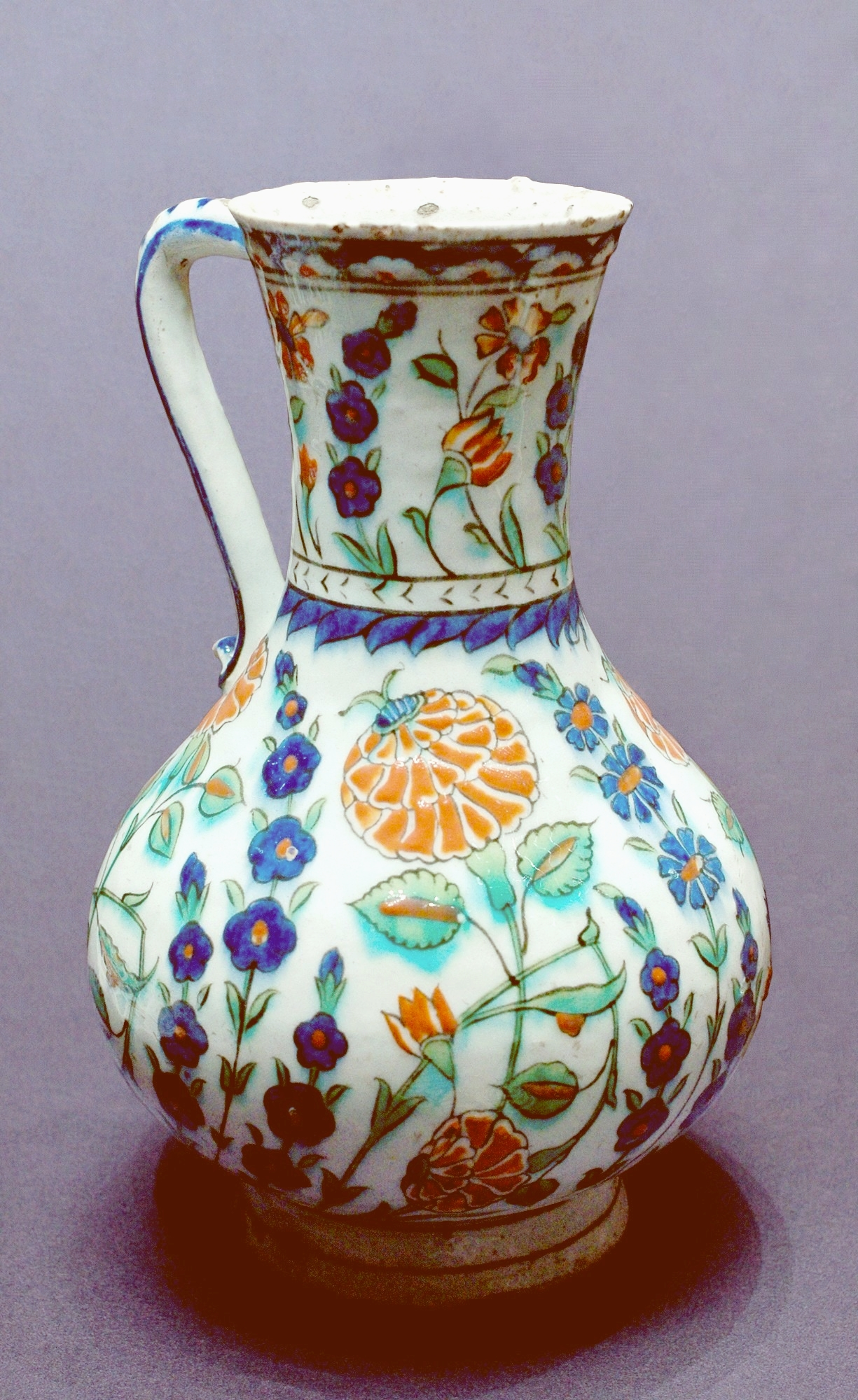
Pitcher with flower decoration, c. 1560–1570

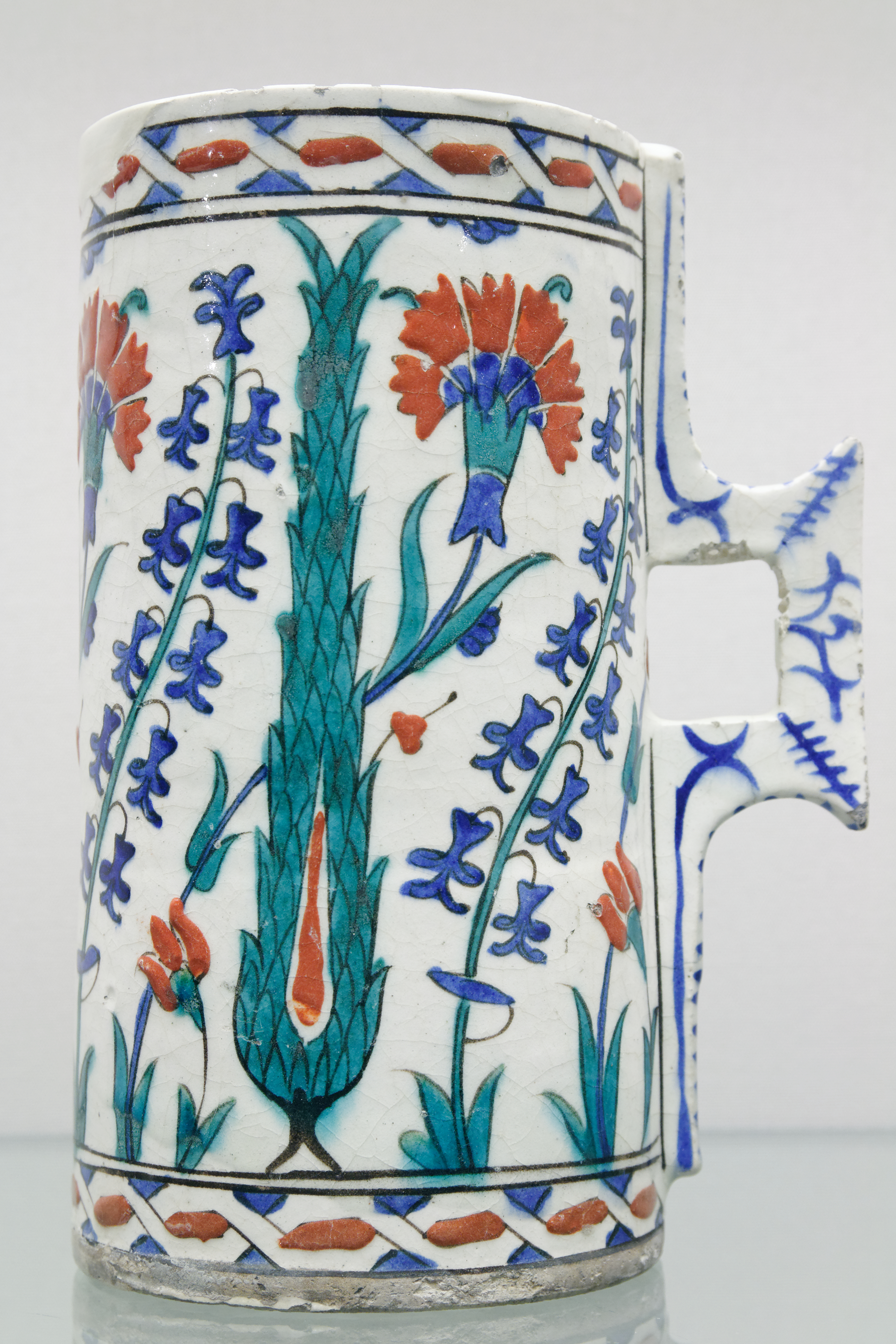
Tankard with cypresses and flowers, c. 1560

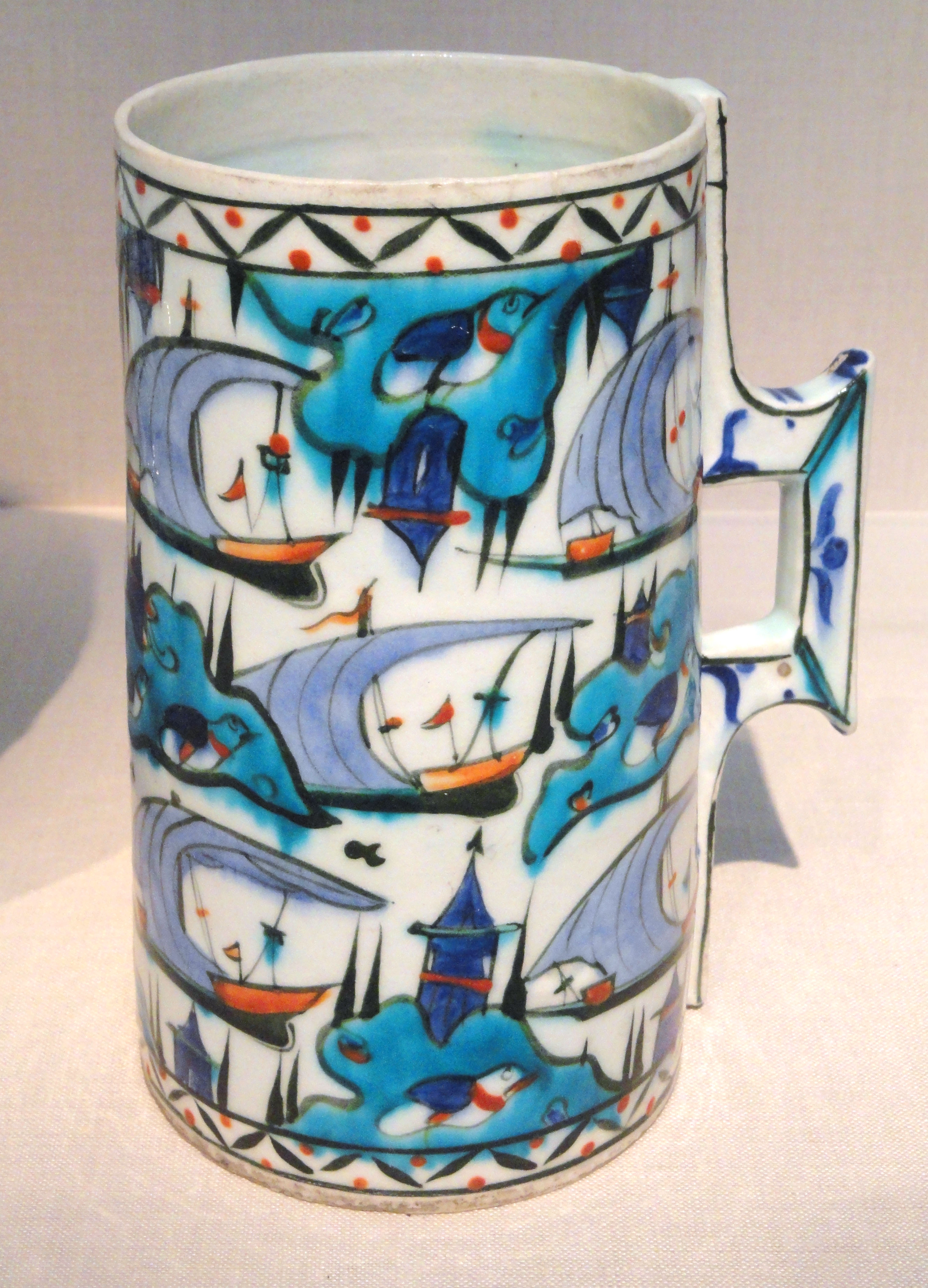
Tankard with ships, c. 1575–1585

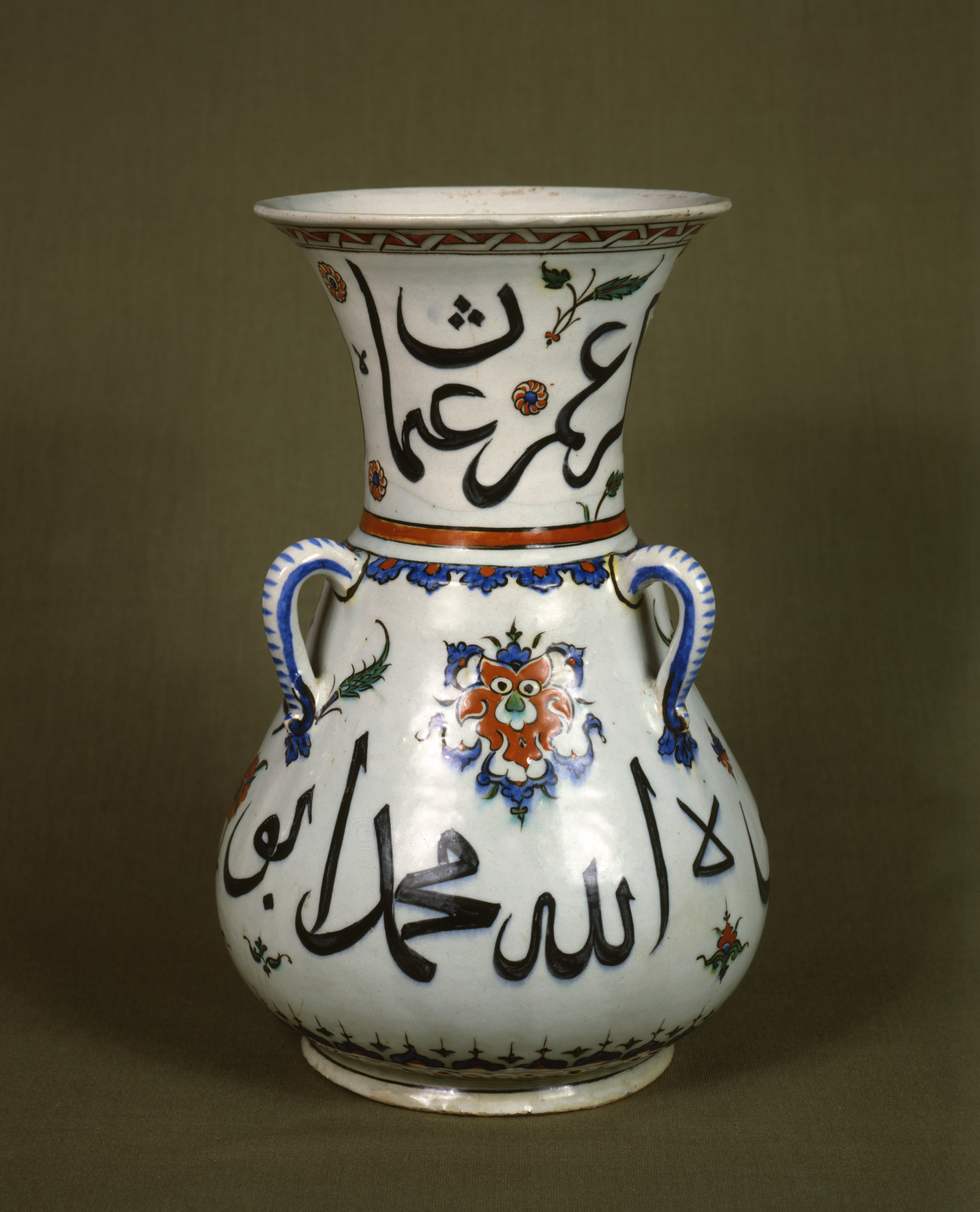
Mosque lamp, c. 1580–1585

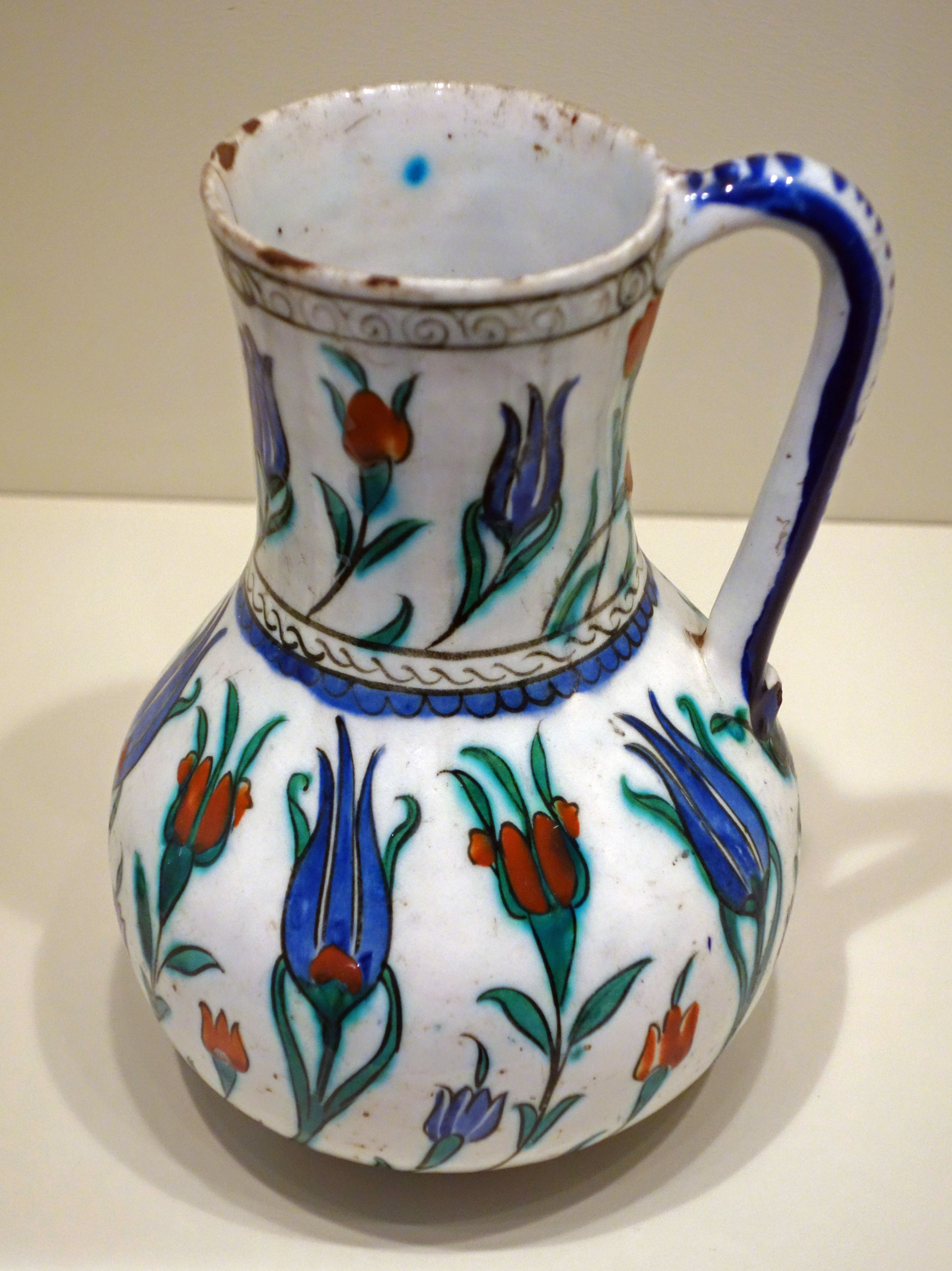
Ewer, last quarter 16th century

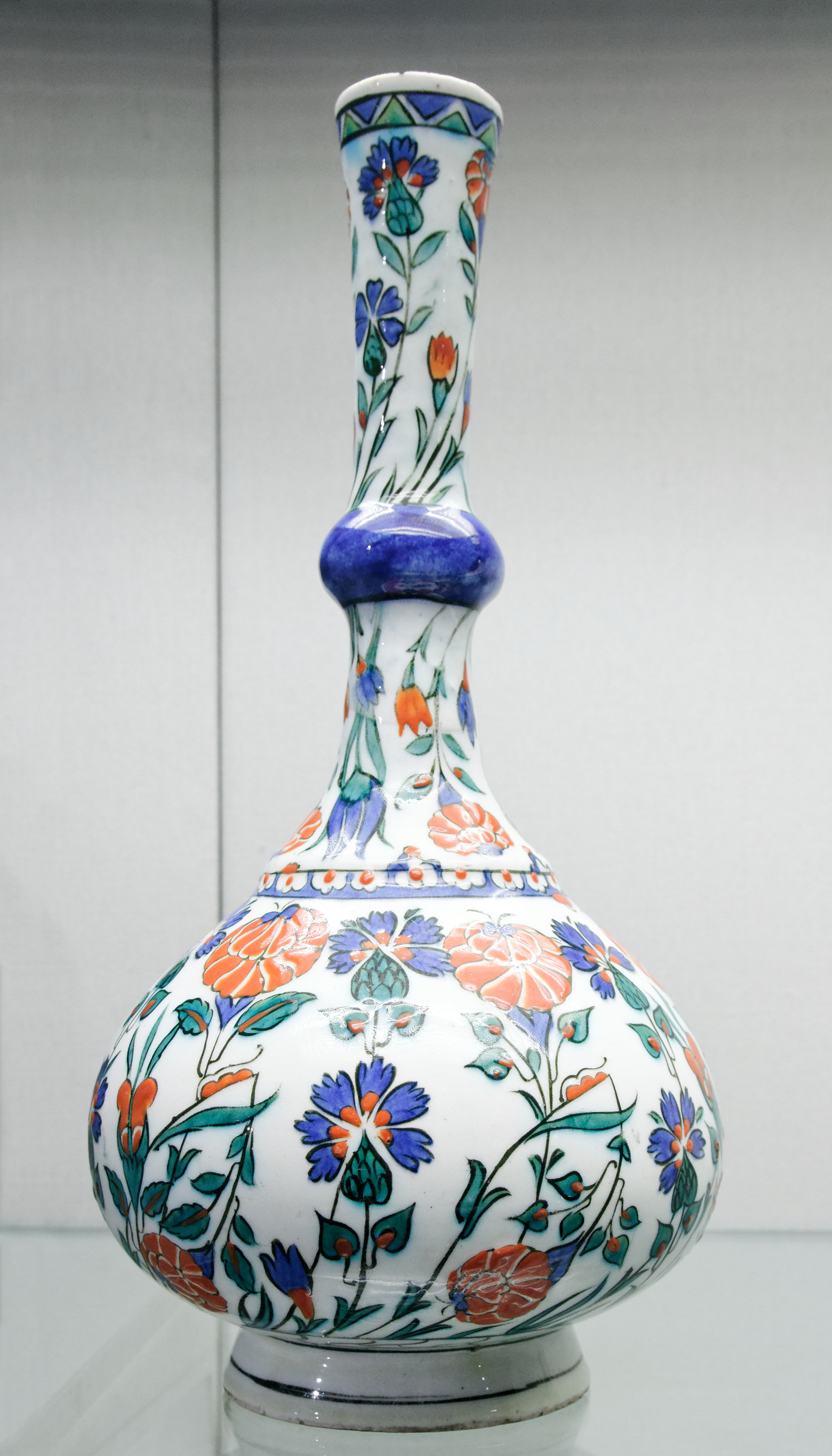
Bottle with roses, carnations and other flowers, c. 1560–1580

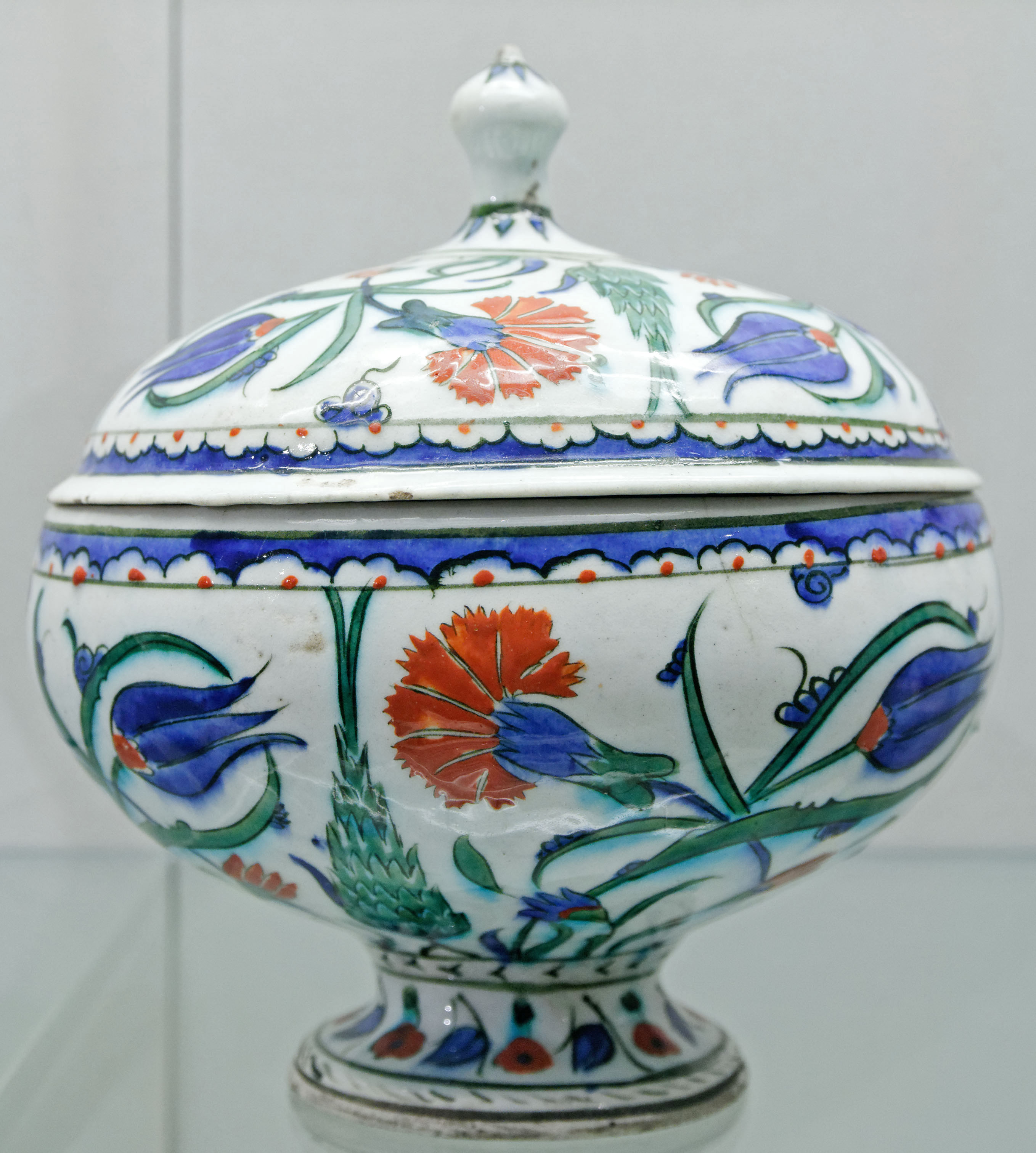
Lidded bowl decorated with cypresses, tulips and carnations, c. 1560–1580

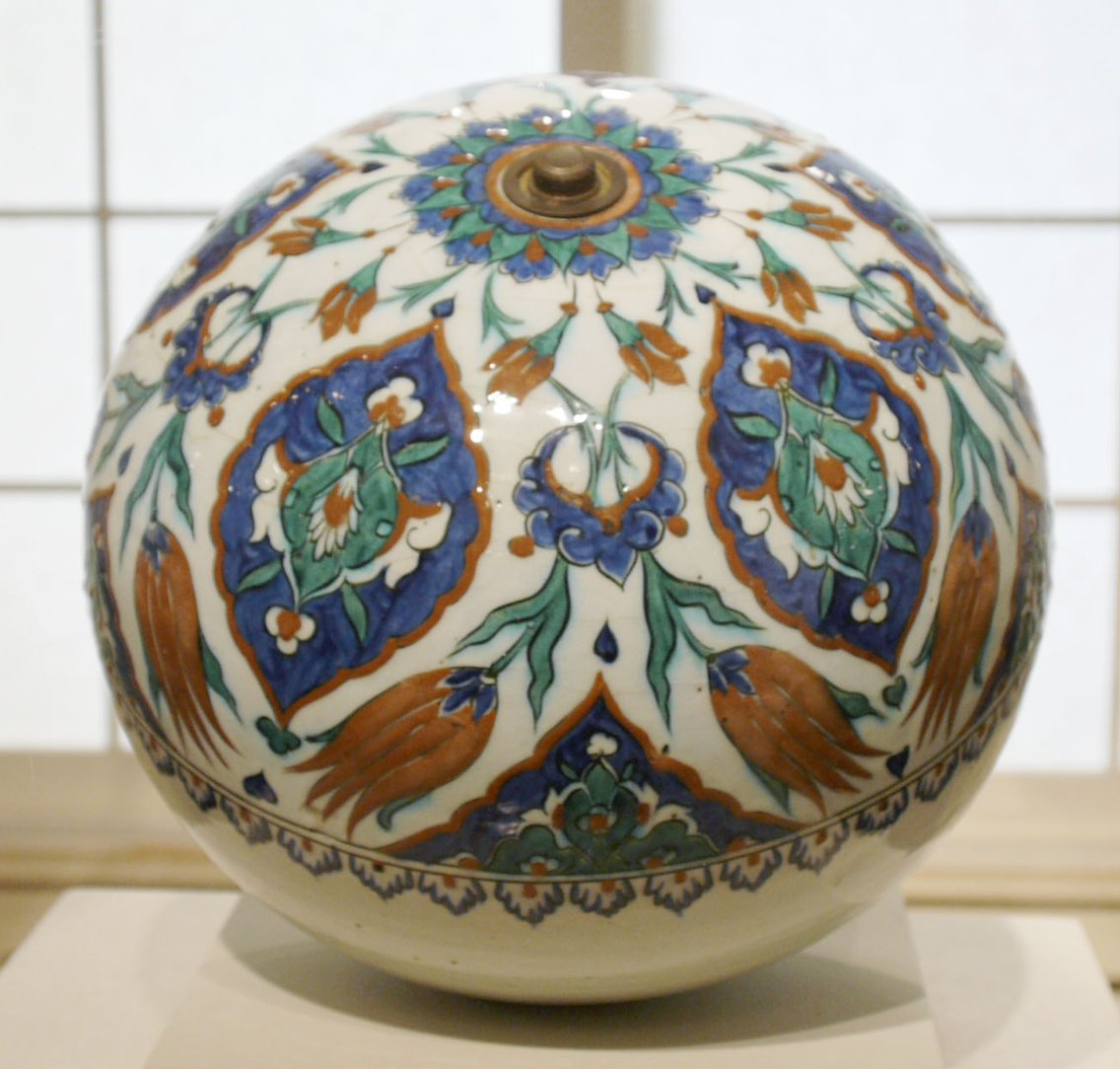
Spherical hanging ornament, c. 1575–1585

== Decline (1600–1700) ==
Towards the end of the 16th century there was a marked decline in the quality of the pottery produced in İznik. This has been linked to the loss of patronage by the Ottoman court and with the imposition of fixed prices in a period of inflation. Another important factor was that from the middle of the 16th century increasing quantities of Chinese porcelain were imported into Turkey. The İznik craftsmen failed to compete with the high quality imports and instead produced pottery with crudely painted rustic designs. Although the Chinese imports did not compete with locally produced tiles, there was little new imperial building and therefore little demand. Even when the court required tiles such as for the mausoleum of Ahmed I built between 1620 and 1623, the low prices led to a drop in the living standards of the potters. They responded by finding new markets outside the Ottoman imposed price system. Tiles were exported to Cairo where they were used to decorate the Aksunkur Mosque which was remodelled by Ibrahim Agha in 1651–1652. Tiles were also exported to Greece where in 1678 the Monastery of the Great Lavra on Mount Athos was decorated with polychrome tiles inscribed with Greek lettering. Nevertheless, there was a decline in the volume of pottery produced and by the mid-17th century only a few kilns remained. The last dated pottery are dishes with crude uncial Greek inscriptions from 1678.

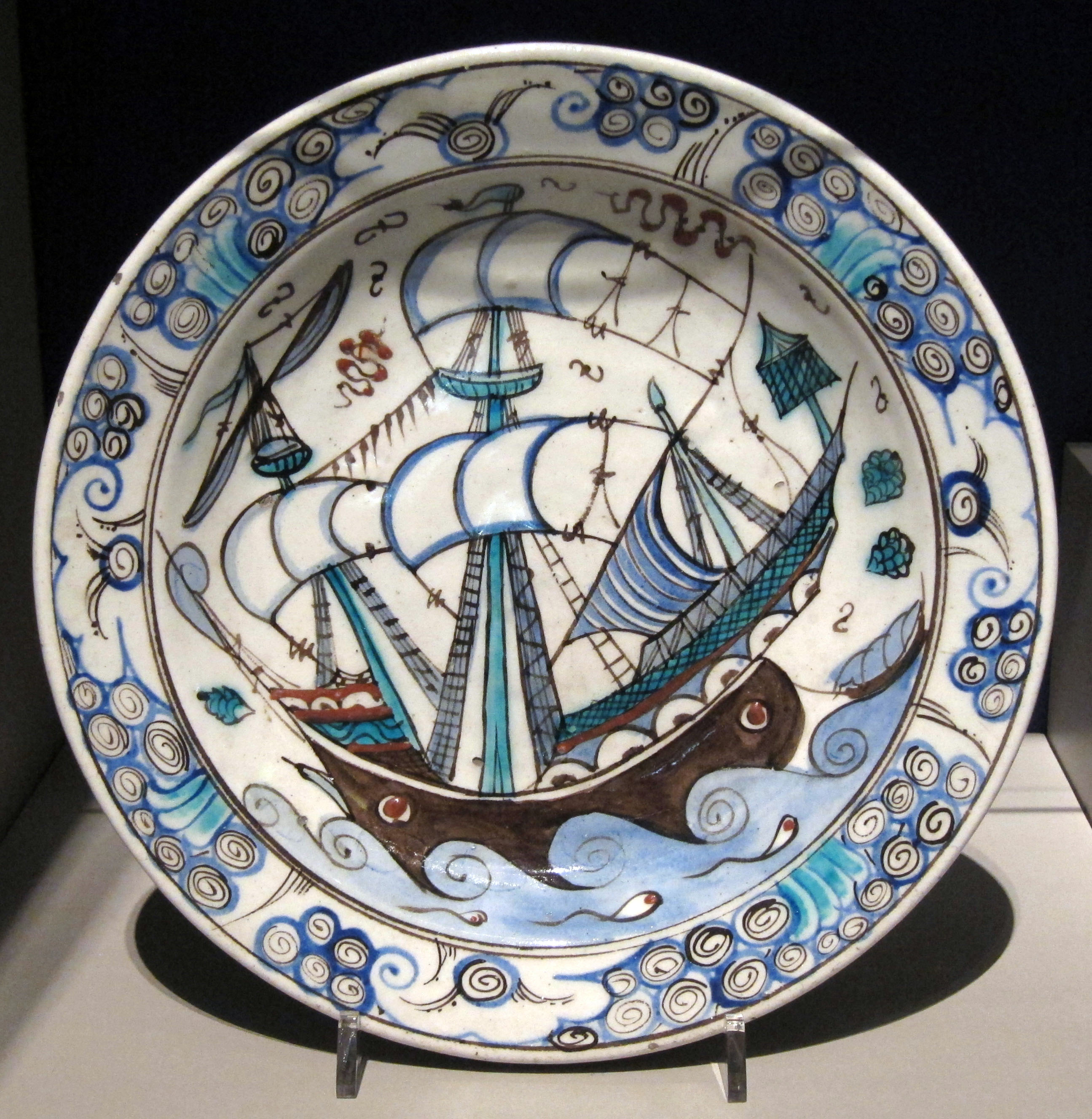
Dish with a ship, c. 1625–1650

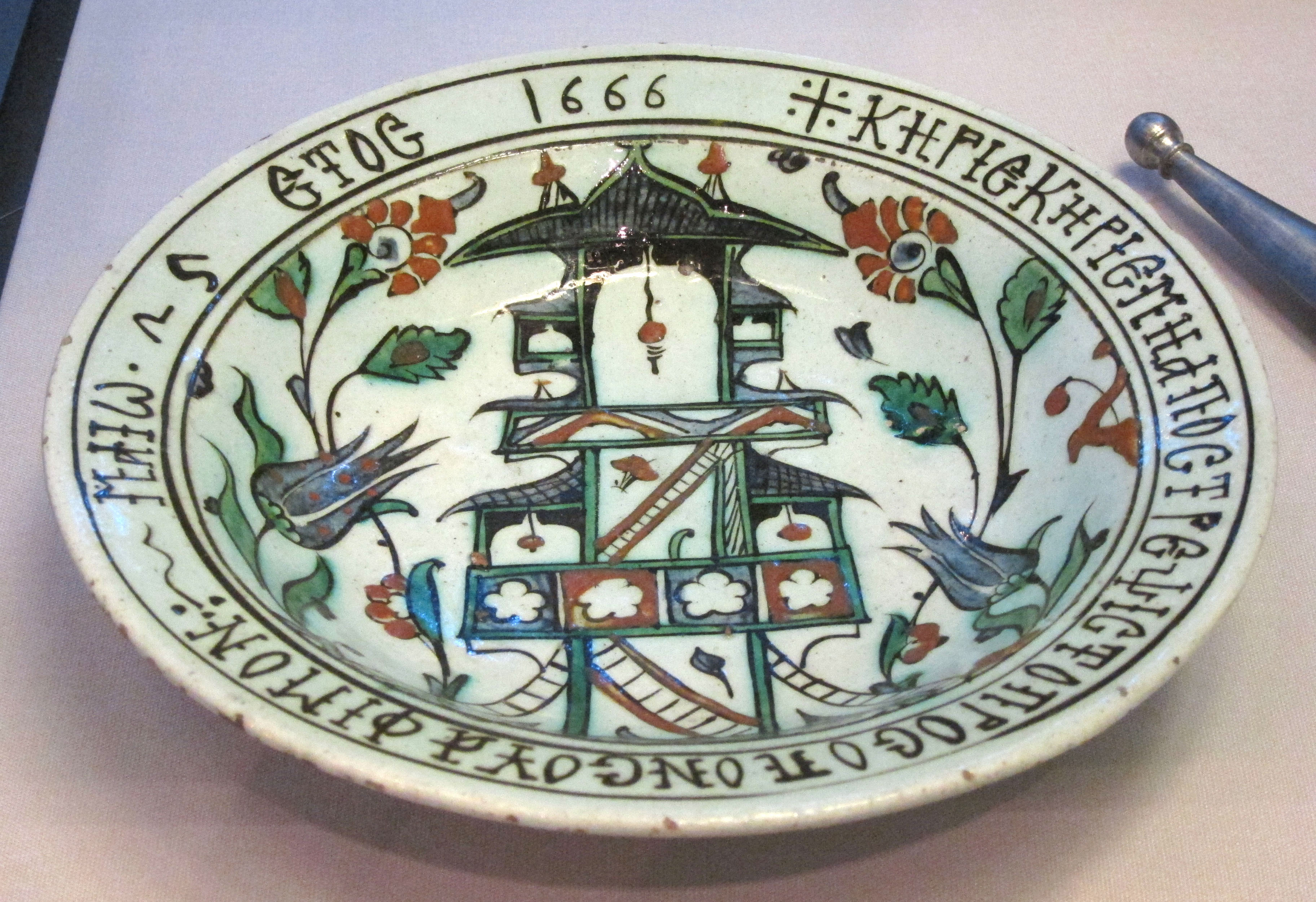
Dish with a pagoda like building and an uncial Greek inscription, dated 1666

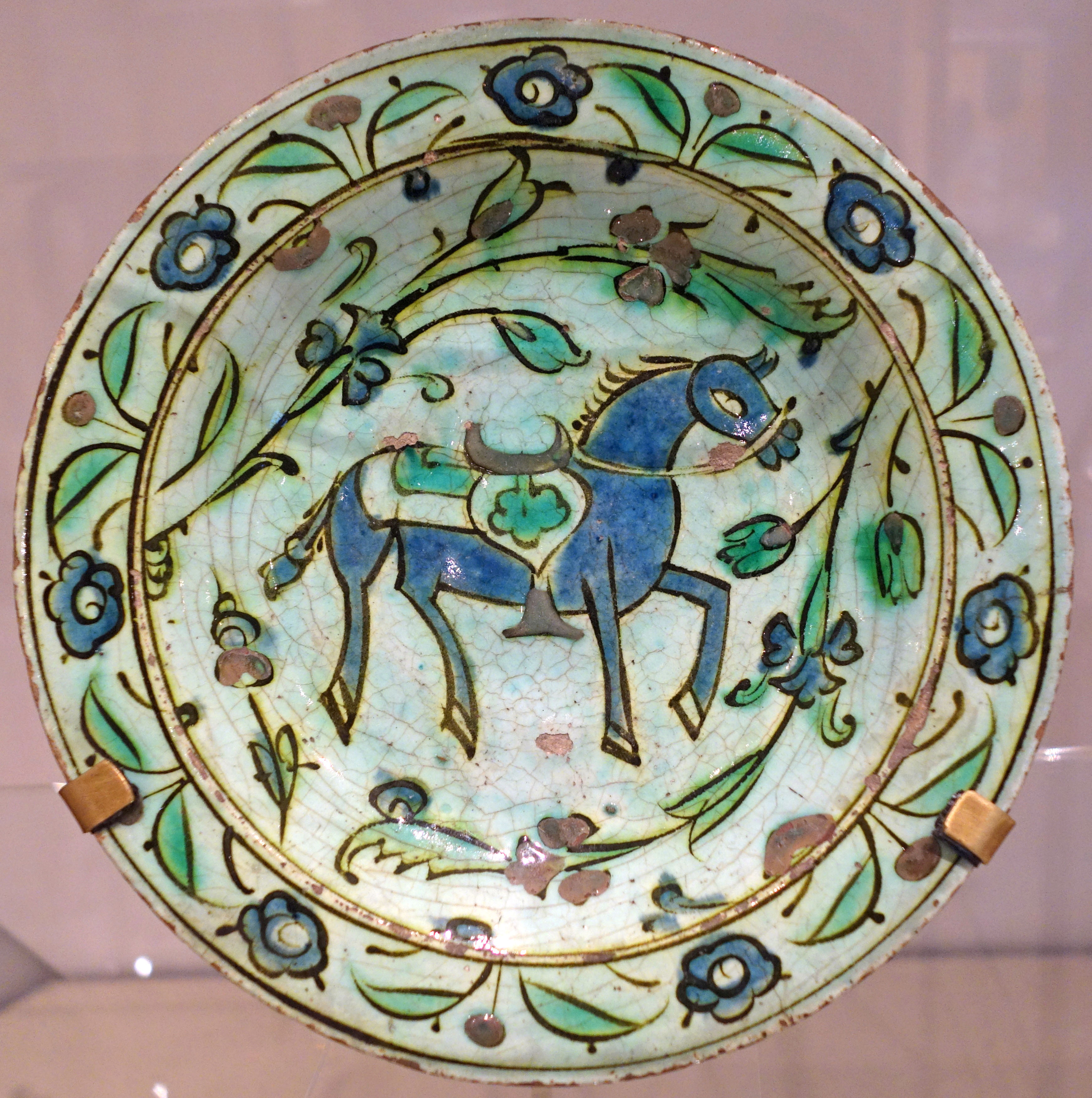
Dish with riderless horse, early 17th century

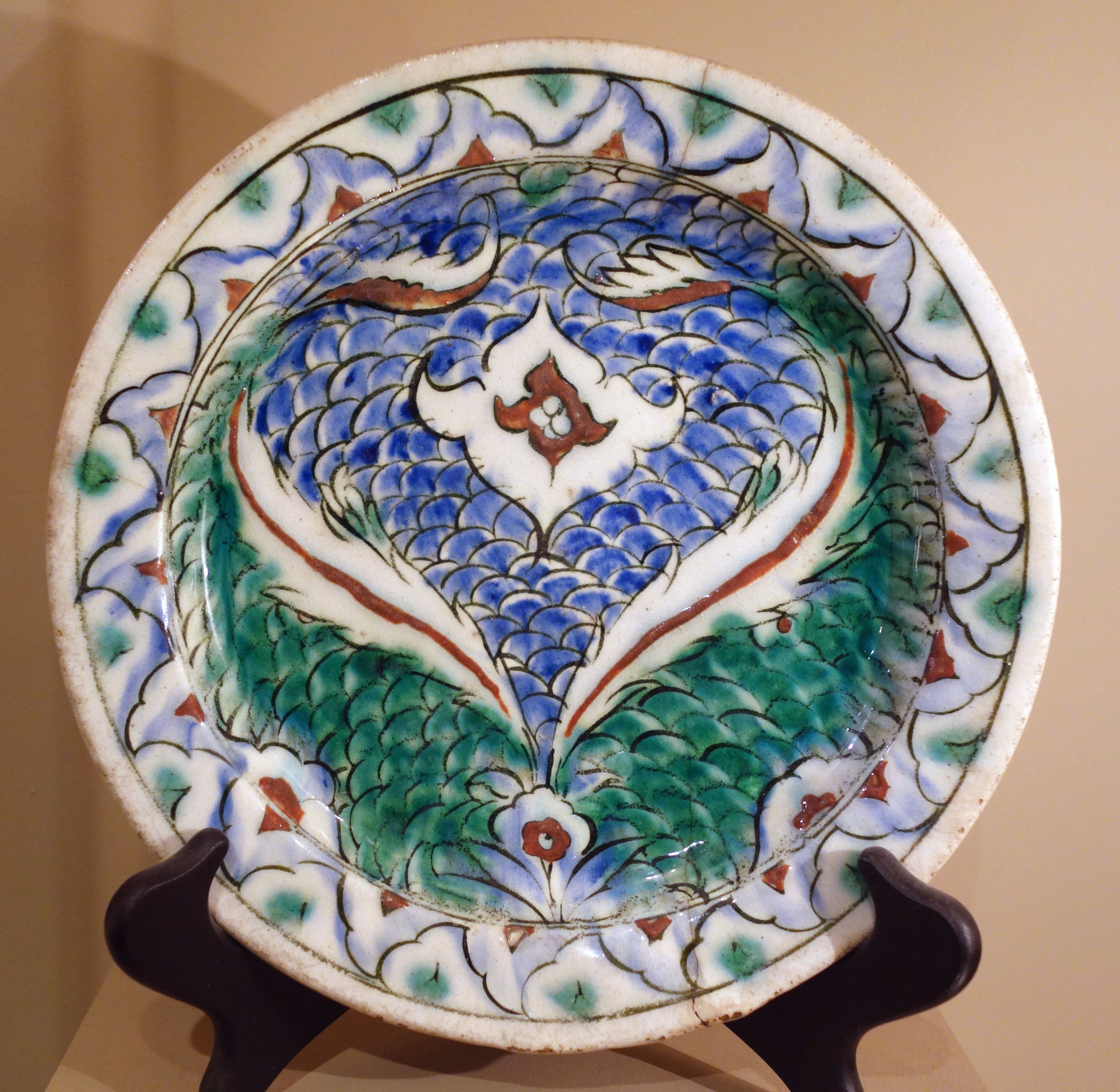
Dish with saz leaves and scale pattern, 17th century

Pottery vessels that combine traditional Iznik designs with modern themes are now produced for the tourist trade in Kütahya.

== See also ==
- Chinese influences on Islamic pottery

== Sources ==
- "Abū'l-Qāsim's treatise on ceramics". Iran.
- Allan, J.W. (1973). "Abū'l-Qāsim's treatise on ceramics". Iran. 11: 111–120. doi:10.2307/4300488. JSTOR 4300488. Archived from the original on 2012-03-23.
- Atasoy, Nurhan; Raby, Julian (1989). Petsopoulos, Yanni (ed.). Iznik: The Pottery of Ottoman Turkey. London: Alexandria Press. ISBN 978-1-85669-054-6.
- Behrens-Abouseif, Doris (1992) [1989]. Islamic Architecture in Cairo: An Introduction. Leiden: Brill. ISBN 978-90-04-09626-4.
- Carswell, John (2006) [1998]. Iznik Pottery. London: British Museum Press. ISBN 978-0-7141-2441-4.
- Denny, Walter B. (1976). "Ceramic revetments of the mosque of the Ramazan Oğlu in Adana". IVème congrès international d'art turc : Aix-en-Provence, 10-15 septembre 1971. Études historiques (Université Provence), no 3. Éditions de l'Université de Provence. pp. 57–65. ISBN 978-2-85399-015-8.
- Denny, Walter B. (2004). Iznik: the Artistry of Ottoman Ceramics. London: Thames & Hudson. ISBN 978-0-500-51192-3.
- Goodwin, Godfrey (2003) [1971]. A History of Ottoman Architecture. London: Thames & Hudson. ISBN 978-0-500-27429-3.
- Necipoğlu, Gülru (1990). "From International Timurid to Ottoman: a change of taste in sixteenth-century ceramic tiles". Muqarnas. 7: 136–170. doi:10.2307/1523126. JSTOR 1523126. Archived from the original on 2021-07-30.
- Necipoğlu, Gülru (2005). The Age of Sinan: Architectural Culture in the Ottoman Empire. London: Reaktion Books. ISBN 978-1-86189-253-9.
- Lane, Arthur (1957a). "The Ottoman pottery of Isnik". Ars Orientalis. 2: 247–281. JSTOR 4629039.
- Lane, Arthur (1957b). Later Islamic pottery: Persia, Syria, Egypt, Turkey. London: Faber and Faber. OCLC 1646726.
