= Flux (disambiguation) =

Flux is a rate of flow through a surface or substance in physics, and has a related meaning in applied mathematics.

Flux may also refer to:

== Science and technology ==
=== Biology and healthcare ===
- Flux (biology), movement of a substance between compartments
- Flux (metabolism), the rate of turnover of molecules through a metabolic pathway
- 4-Fluoroamphetamine (4-FA; PAL-303; "Flux"), a central nervous system stimulant with quasi-amphetamine effects
- Dysentery, or other diseases called "flux", which cause the loss of fluid by diarrhea or hemorrhage
- Rheumatism (historically), or "flux", thought to be caused by an excessive flow of rheum or fluid into a joint
- Slime flux, a bacterial disease that occurs on certain trees

=== Computing ===
- Flux (machine-learning framework)
- Flux (graphics software), a suite of VRML/X3D viewing/authoring software
- Flux (software company), a developer of workflow software
- Flux (text-to-image model), a suite of text-to-image model developed by Black Forest Labs
- f.lux, a program that adjusts the color temperature of a computer display
- Fast flux, a DNS technique used by botnets to hide phishing and malware delivery sites

=== Physics and engineering ===
==== Materials ====
- Flux (metallurgy), a chemical reducing agent, flowing agent, or purifying agent enhancing success in soldering and like joining of metals
- Ceramic flux, a substance which lowers the melting point and promotes glass formation in ceramic materials and glasses
  - Secondary flux, a substance which acts as a ceramic flux in combination with other materials or at higher temperatures

==== Something integrated over a surface ====
- Electric flux, the electric field through a surface integrated over the surface's area
- Luminous flux, luminous intensity integrated over solid angle. Used in photometry
- Magnetic flux, magnetic field through a surface integrated over the surface's area
- Radiant flux, the total power emitted by a source. Used in radiometry

==== Something per unit area ====
- Intensity (physics), power per unit area (sometimes also called flux)

== People with the name ==
- Alfred William Flux (1867–1942), British economist and statistician
- Robert Flux, guitarist of the band Oomph!
- Maarten van der Vleuten (born 1967), Dutch composer and producer, alias Flux

== Art and entertainment ==
=== Fictional characters ===
- Flux (comics), a Marvel Comics antagonist opposing the Hulk
- Flux (Dennis Sykes), a character in the Marvel Comics series 1 Month 2 Live
- Flux Wildly, a character in the computer game Toonstruck

=== Literature ===
- Flux (novel), a book by Stephen Baxter
- "Flux", a short story by Michael Moorcock

=== Music ===
- Flux (Alison Goldfrapp album), 2025
- Flux (Caveman Shoestore album), 1994
- Flux (Poppy album), or the title song, 2021
- Flux (Rich Robinson album), 2016
- Flux, an album by Love Spirals Downwards, 1998
- "Flux" (Bloc Party song), 2007
- "Flux" (Ellie Goulding song), 2019
- "Flux", a song by Lamb of God from New American Gospel, 2000

=== Other uses in art and entertainment ===
- Flux (magazine), a music, comic book and video game magazine of the 1990s
- MTV Flux, a former television channel in the United Kingdom and Japan
- Doctor Who: Flux, the thirteenth series of the British science fiction television programme
- Bit.Trip Flux, the 6th and final main game in the Bit.Trip video game series

== Other uses ==
- Flux (political party), a political party in Australia
- Flux, Utah, a ghost town and former mining community in Tooele County, Utah
- "Flux", the imagery of the River in the fragments of the presocratic philosopher Heraclitus

== See also ==
- Æon Flux, an animated television show
- Fluxus, an art movement
- Fluxx, a card game
- Influx (disambiguation)
