= Raqqa ware =

Style of lustreware pottery

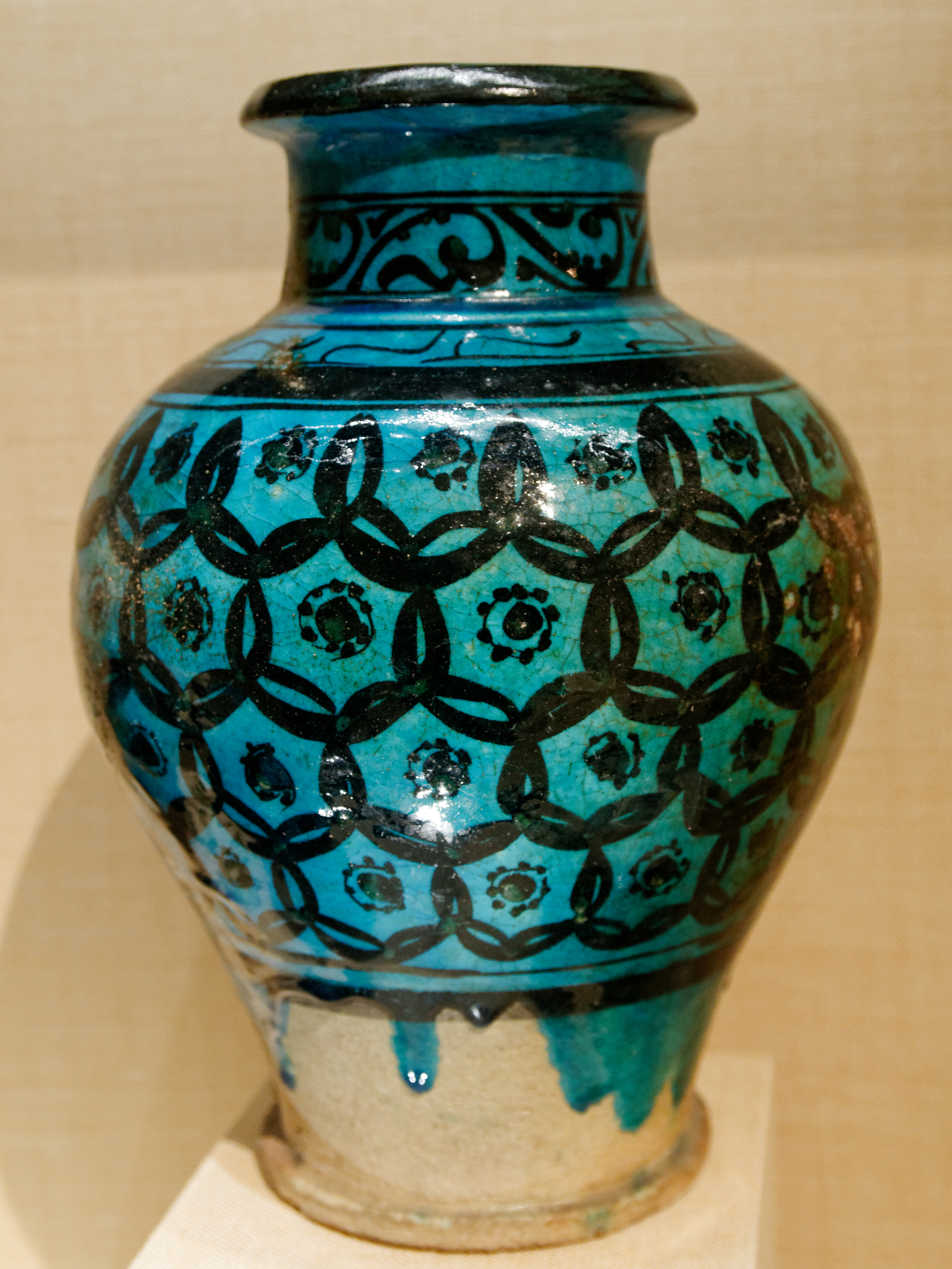
An incomplete Raqqa ware jar, c. 1200

Raqqa ware or Rakka ware is a style of lustreware pottery that was a mainstay of the economy of Raqqa in northeastern Syria during the Ayyubid dynasty. Though the ceramics were varied in character, they have been identified during the 20th century by on-site excavations that securely linked the highly sought-after surviving pieces to Raqqa. However, Raqqa was not the only production site and Raqqa Ware has been found at various locations on the Euphrates, such as Qala'at Balis. The pieces typically have a white body covered in siliceous glaze, with decorations in brown luster or blue and back underglaze. The glazes most often vary in both transparency and shades of turquoise, however other colors were also used. Raqqa ware typically consists of kitchen items such as jars, dishes, and bowls with basic shapes that served everyday purposes such as storage. Some sculptural figures exist, and though their original purpose is debated, they are thought to be toys or decorations for the home.

== Production ==
Lustre bowl

Raqqa ware ceramics are generally made with a coarse stonepaste that appears reddish-grey before firing. Occasionally, while the stonepaste was still wet, the piece's exterior was either engraved or embossed to add relief decoration. After drying, the frit body was then covered in a layer of white slip. Monochrome and polychrome underglaze with stains of either copper (turquoise), cobalt (blue) or manganese (purplish-brown) were then applied. The pieces were also decorated with designs in black and blue at this stage. Decorative patterning, though bold, was typically simple. Some works exhibit complex patterning, but the most humble are completed with just a turquoise glaze. Recurring shapes include calligraphy, faux calligraphy, spirals, trefoils, vegetal patterns and arabesque. The ornamental patterns and shapes on Raqqa wares are not precise, and the materials used were coarse and inexpensive; this suggests that these wares were created for the middle and lower classes. After drying, the ceramics were further covered in a thick layer of glaze, typically in various shades of turquoise, however a lustre layer, of chocolate, reddish-brown or gray colors, could also be used. The resulting works are simple ceramics with bright coloring and bold decoration. Most often, Raqqa ware is turquoise, but purple, deep blue, and pale green pieces exist.

== Historiography ==
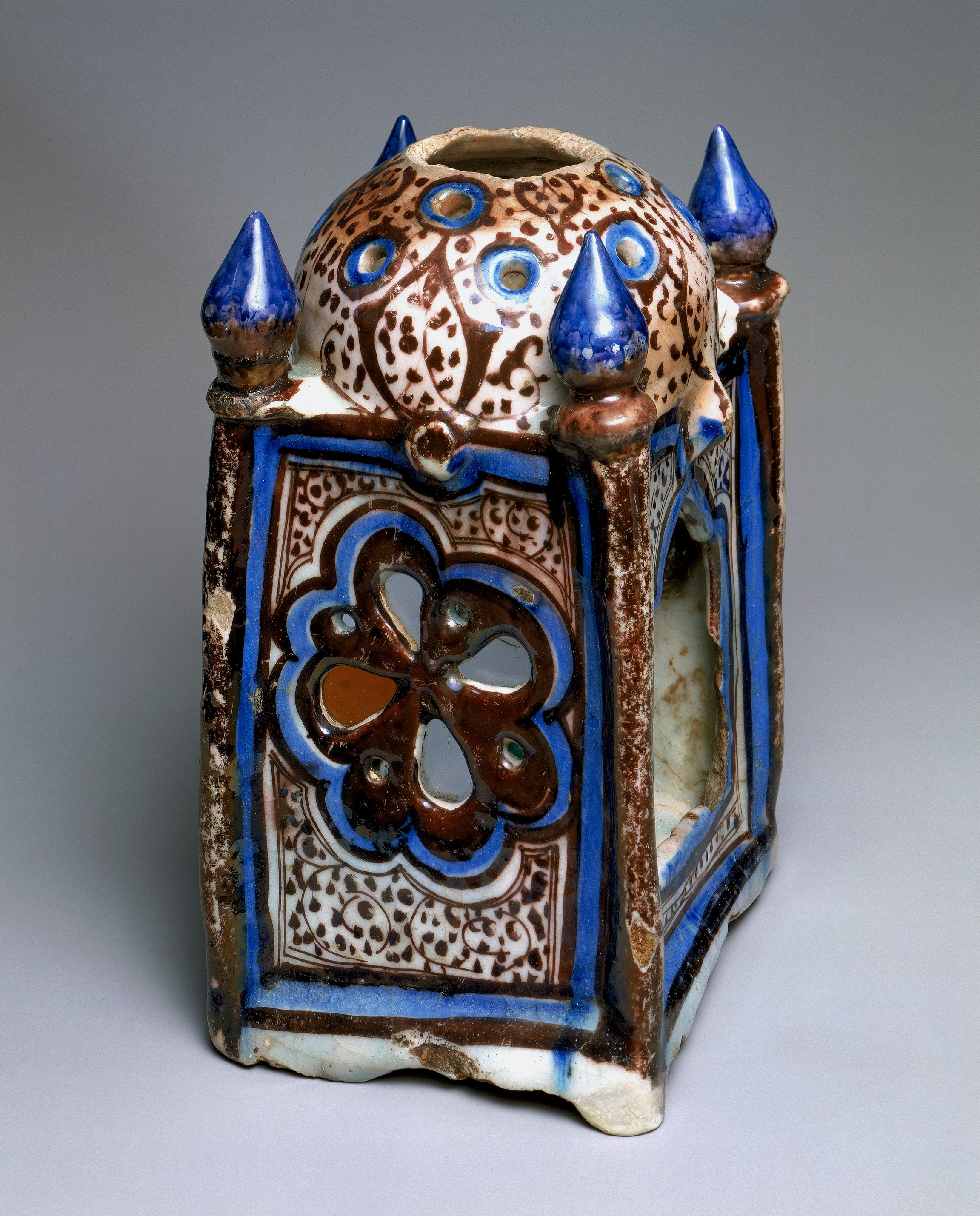
Ceramic lantern

The definition of "Raqqa ware" and the ceramics themselves have been a subject of debate and controversy since the coining of the term in the late 19th century. This is due to the influence of salesmen's market schemes in academia, the implication that Raqqa Ware was unique to Raqqa, and questionably vague provenances of works that exist in both museums and private collections today. "Raqqa ware" has thus become a term referring to an overarching group of ceramics that fall into the same stylistic category, but does not necessarily indicate a Raqqan origin, as works have been found along the Euphrates River, throughout Southern Anatolia, Syria and Egypt.

Marilyn Jenkins-Madina and other scholars attribute the beginning of this confusion about Raqqa Ware to "Orientalism", the late 19th and early 20th century European fascination with the Middle East. Many factors, including French Imperialism, Romanticism and the translation of Alf Layla wa-Layla (One Thousand and One Nights), from Arabic into English and French, increased the European interest with the so-called "Orient". As this fascination with the Middle East rose dramatically, tourism intensified as well as the demand for art objects. Art associated with One Thousand and One Nights, such as the ceramics found in Raqqa, the site of the principal palace of Harun al-Rashid, an Abbasid Caliph and prominent figure in the novel, were particularly easy to market to Western consumers. Many of salesmen and archeologists took advantage of the situation, and Raqqa ware began to appear on the European markets at the end of the 19th century. However, these salesmen often manipulated the dating of the objects to align with the false 9th century narrative they were creating as a marketing scheme. In reality, some of the ceramics sold were not actually Raqqan, and pieces that were Raqqan, were produced in the first half of the 13th century, entirely halting with the invasion of the Mongols. This postdates Harun al-Rashid by nearly 400 years. These manipulations and misinformation caused great confusion about Raqqa ware.

The original state-sponsored excavations at Raqqa were underfunded and hard to protect from looters and salesmen. Some Circassians, refugees fleeing religious persecution from Caucasus in 1905 resettled just west of Raqqa. There are many reports of both locals and Circassians looting the cite, conducting illegal excavations, and openly selling the unearthed materials to tourists. Because of this, some antique businesses directly sourced ceramics from illegal excavations. As a byproduct of this illegal trade, many objects originally sold to tourists and now housed in private collections and museums today have vague provenances that lack documentation.

"Raqqa ware" can refer to pottery that is not unique to Raqqa. Though universally referred to as "Raqqa ware", the pottery discovered in Raqqa was not unique to the site, and the style was by no means limited to that city. Wasters – discarded and unsellable ceramics that were damaged during production – were discovered in excavations at Balis, Syria, indicating that the site was a location of Raqqa ware production.

== Collections ==
Major collections are at the Metropolitan Museum of Art and the Ashmolean Museum.
