= Fritware =

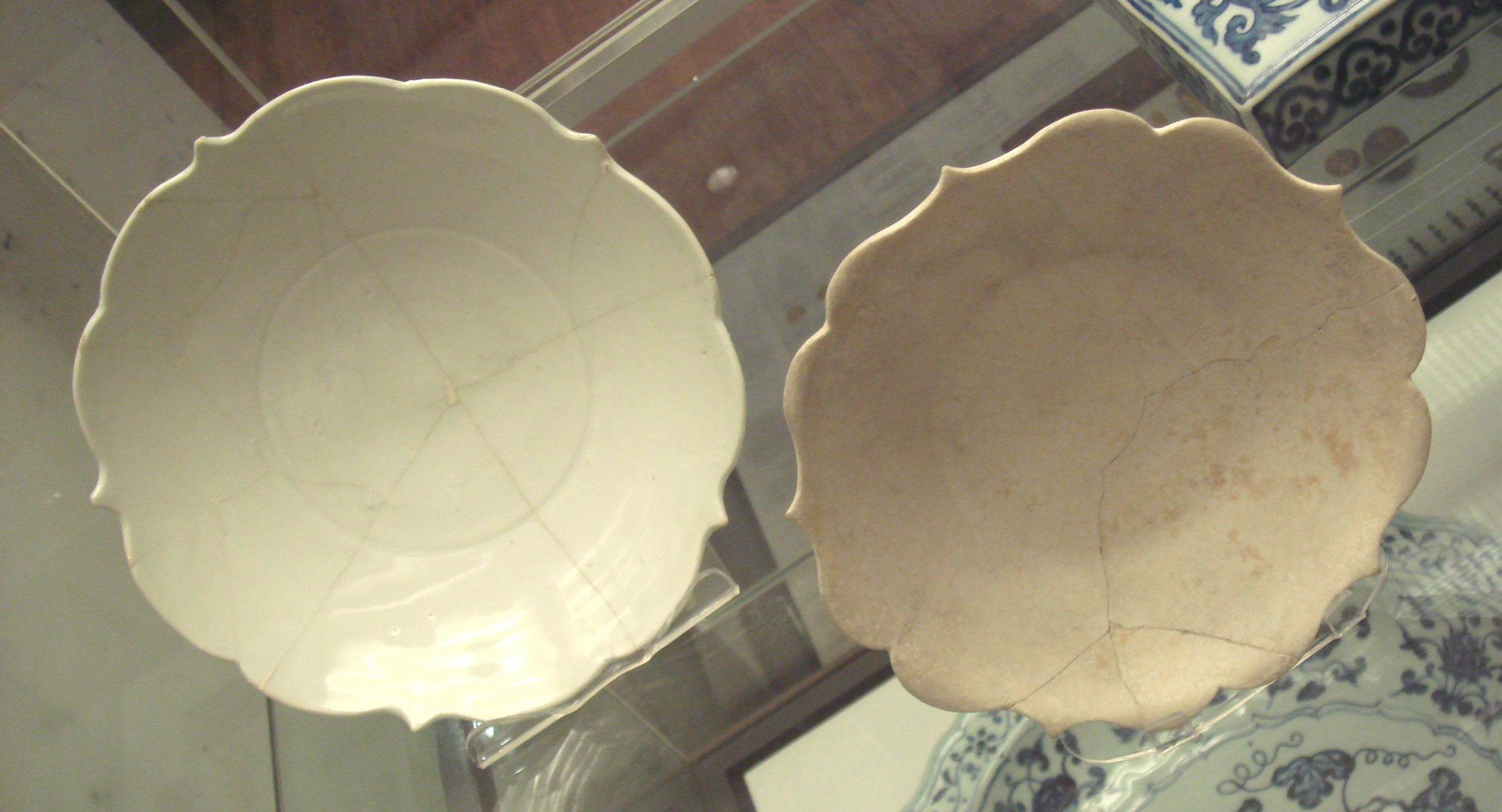
Chinese porcelain dish (left), 9th century, excavated in Iran, and a fritware dish made in Iran (right), 12th century (British Museum)

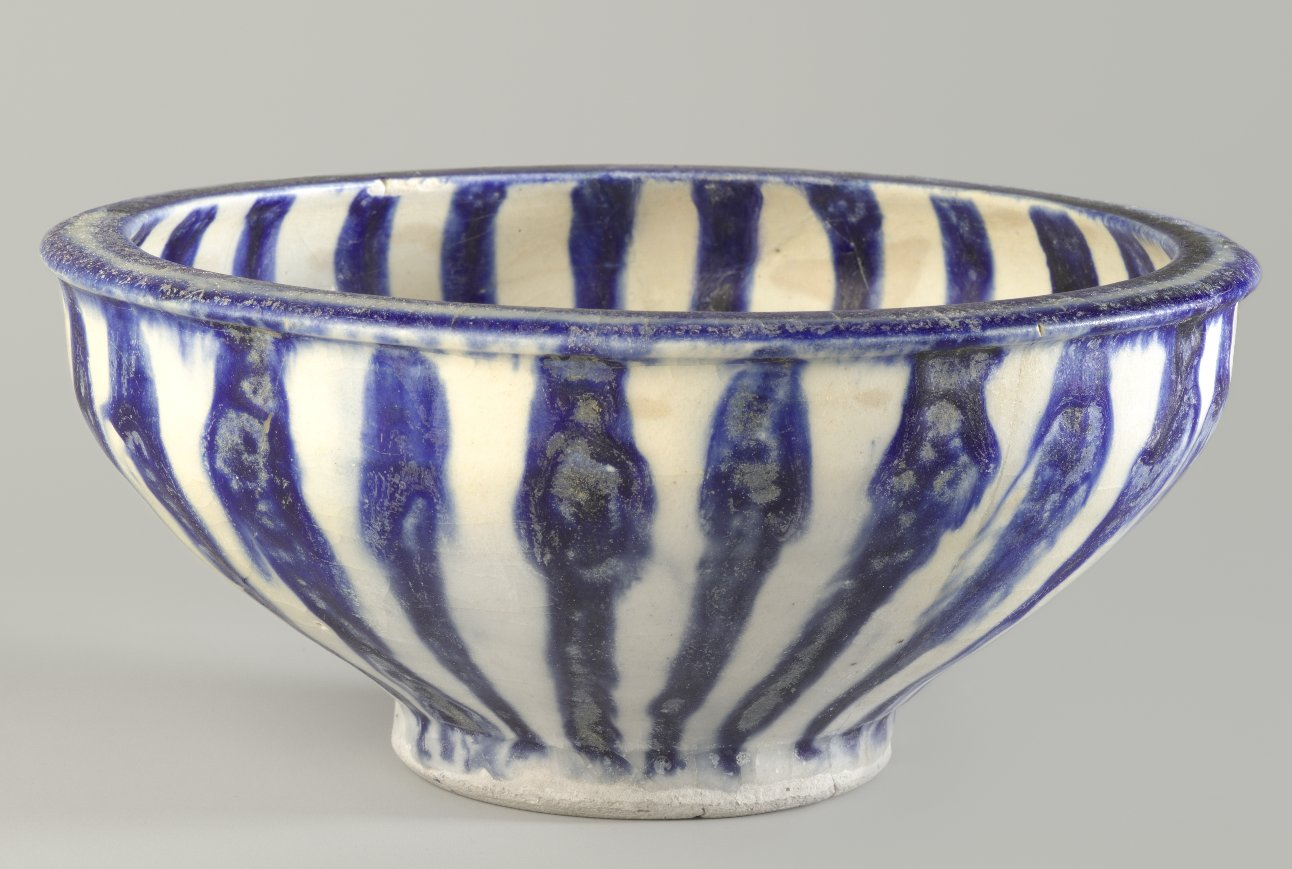
Blue and white bowl with radial design, 13th century, Iran (Brooklyn Museum)

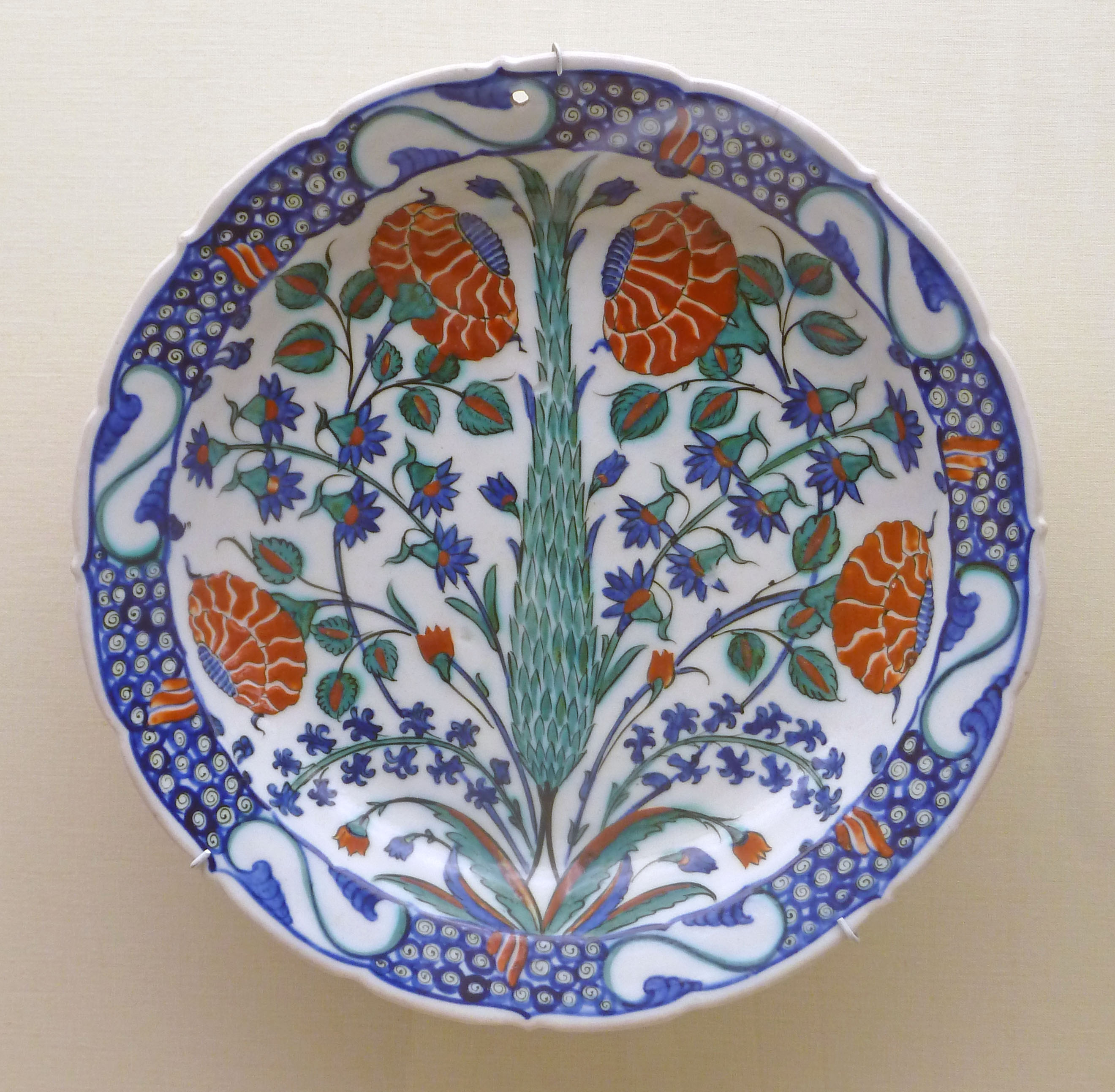
Dish with cypress tree decoration, 1570–1575, İznik (Calouste Gulbenkian Museum)

Fritware, also known as stone-paste, is a type of pottery in which ground glass (frit) is added to clay to reduce its fusion temperature. The mixture may include quartz or other siliceous material. An organic compound such as gum or glue may be added for binding. The resulting mixture can be fired at a lower temperature than clay alone. A glaze is then applied on the surface.

Fritware was invented to give a strong white body, which, combined with tin-glazing of the surface, allowed it to approximate the result of Chinese porcelain. Porcelain was not manufactured in the Islamic world until modern times, and most fine Islamic pottery was made of fritware. Frit was also a significant component in some early European porcelains.

== Composition and techniques ==
Fritware was invented in the Medieval Islamic world to give a strong white body, which, combined with tin-glazing of the surface, allowed it to approximate the white colour, translucency, and thin walls of Chinese porcelain. True porcelain was not manufactured in the Islamic world until modern times, and most fine Islamic pottery was made of fritware. Frit was also a significant component in some early European porcelains.

Although its production centres may have shifted with time and imperial power, fritware remained in continued use throughout the Islamic world with little significant innovation. The technique was used to create many other significant artistic traditions such as lustreware, Raqqa ware, and Iznik pottery.

Raw materials in one contemporary recipe used in Jaipur are quartz powder, glass powder, fuller's earth, borax and tragacanth gum. Raw materials for a glaze are reported to be glass powder, lead oxide, borax, potassium nitrate, zinc oxide and boric acid. The blue decoration is cobalt oxide.

== History ==
Frit is crushed glass that is used in ceramics. The pottery produced from the manufacture of frit is often called 'fritware' but has also been referred to as "stonepaste" and "faience" among other names. Fritware was innovative because the glaze and the body of the ceramic piece were made of nearly the same materials, allowing them to fuse better, be less likely to flake, and could also be fired at a lower temperature.

The manufacture of proto-fritware began in Iraq in the 9th century AD under the Abbasid Caliphate, and with the establishment of Samarra as its capital in 836, there is extensive evidence of ceramics in the court of the Abbasids both in Samarra and Baghdad. A ninth-century corpus of 'proto-stonepaste' from Baghdad has "relict glass fragments" in its fabric. The glass is alkali-lime-lead-silica and, when the paste was fired or cooled, wollastonite and diopside crystals formed within the glass fragments. The lack of "inclusions of crushed pottery" suggests these fragments did not come from a glaze. The reason for their addition would have been to release alkali into the matrix on firing, which would "accelerate vitrification at a relatively low firing temperature, and thus increase the hardness and density of the [ceramic] body."

Following the fall of the Abbasid Caliphate, the main centres of manufacture moved to Egypt where true fritware was invented between the 10th and the 12th centuries under the Fatimids, but the technique then spread throughout the Middle East.

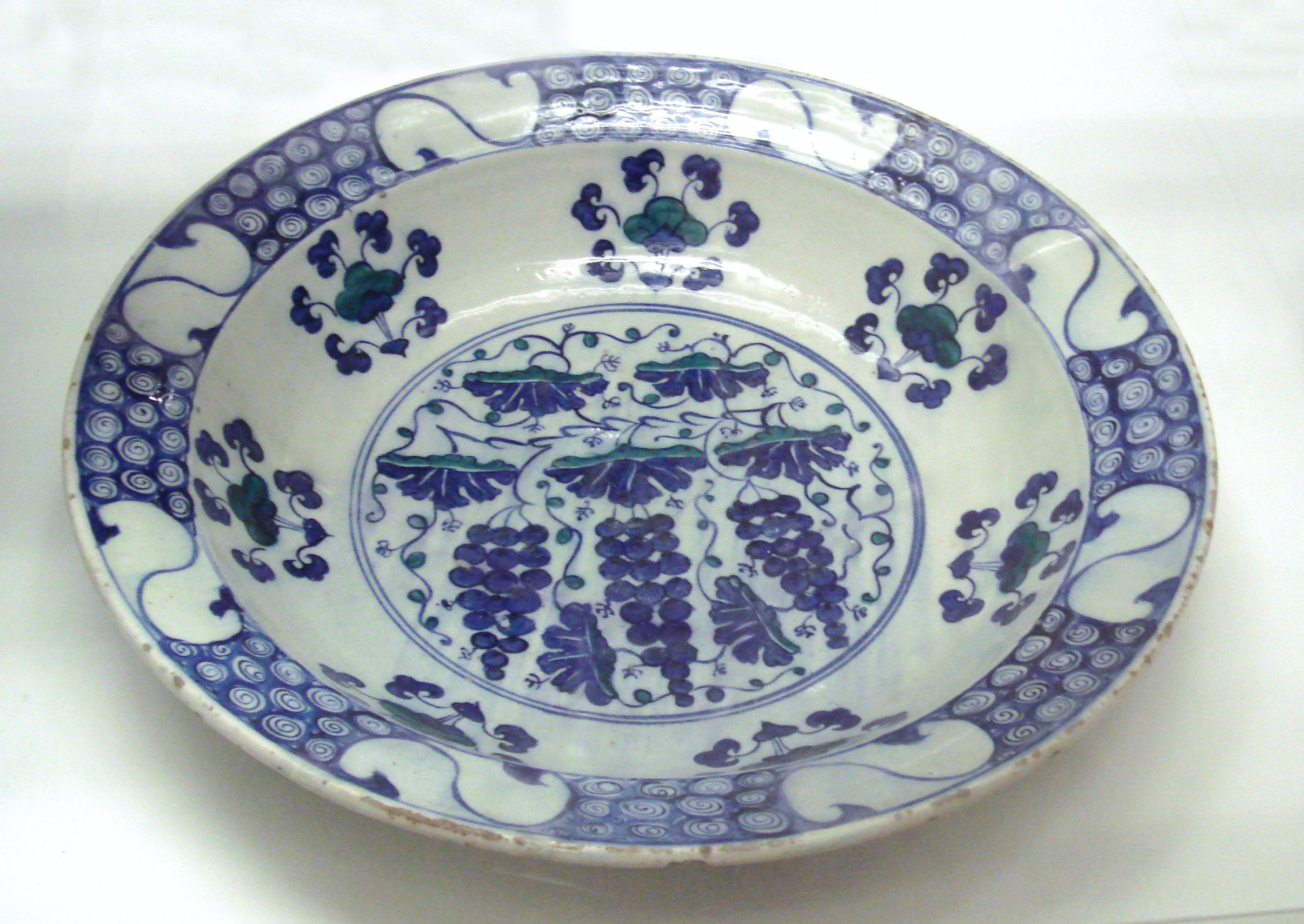
Fritware dish with grape design, Iznik pottery, Turkey, 1550–1570 (British Museum)

There are many variations on designs, colour, and composition, the last often attributed to the differences in mineral compositions of soil and rock used in the production of fritware. The bodies of the fritware ceramics were always made quite thin to imitate their porcelain counterparts in China, a practice not common before the discovery of the frit technique which produced stronger ceramics. In the 13th century the town of Kashan in Iran was an important centre for the production of fritware. Abū'l-Qāsim, who came from a family of tilemakers in the city, wrote a treatise in 1301 on precious stones that included a chapter on the manufacture of fritware. His recipe specified a fritware body containing a mixture of 10 parts silica to 1 part glass frit and 1 part clay. The frit was prepared by mixing powdered quartz with soda which acted as a flux. The mixture was then heated in a kiln. The internal circulation of pottery within the Islamic world from its earliest days was quite common, with the movement of ideas regarding pottery without their physical presence in certain areas being readily apparent. The movement of fritware into China - whose monopoly on porcelain production had prompted the Islamic world to produce fritware to begin with - impacted Chinese porcelain decoration, deriving the signature cobalt blue colour from Islamic traditions of fritware decoration. The transfer of this artistic idea was likely a consequence of the enhanced connection and trade relations between the Middle and Near East and Far East Asia under the Mongols beginning in the 13th century. The Middle and Near East had an initial monopoly on the cobalt colour due to its own richness in cobalt ore, which was especially abundant in Qamsar and Anarak in Persia.

Iznik pottery was produced in Ottoman Turkey beginning in the last quarter of 15th century AD. It consists of a body, slip, and glaze, where the body and glaze are 'quartz-frit'. The 'frits' in both cases "are unusual in that they contain lead oxide as well as soda"; the lead oxide would help reduce the thermal expansion coefficient of the ceramic. Microscopic analysis reveals that the material that has been labeled 'frit' is 'interstitial glass' which serves to connect the quartz particles. The glass was added as frit and the interstitial glass formed on firing.

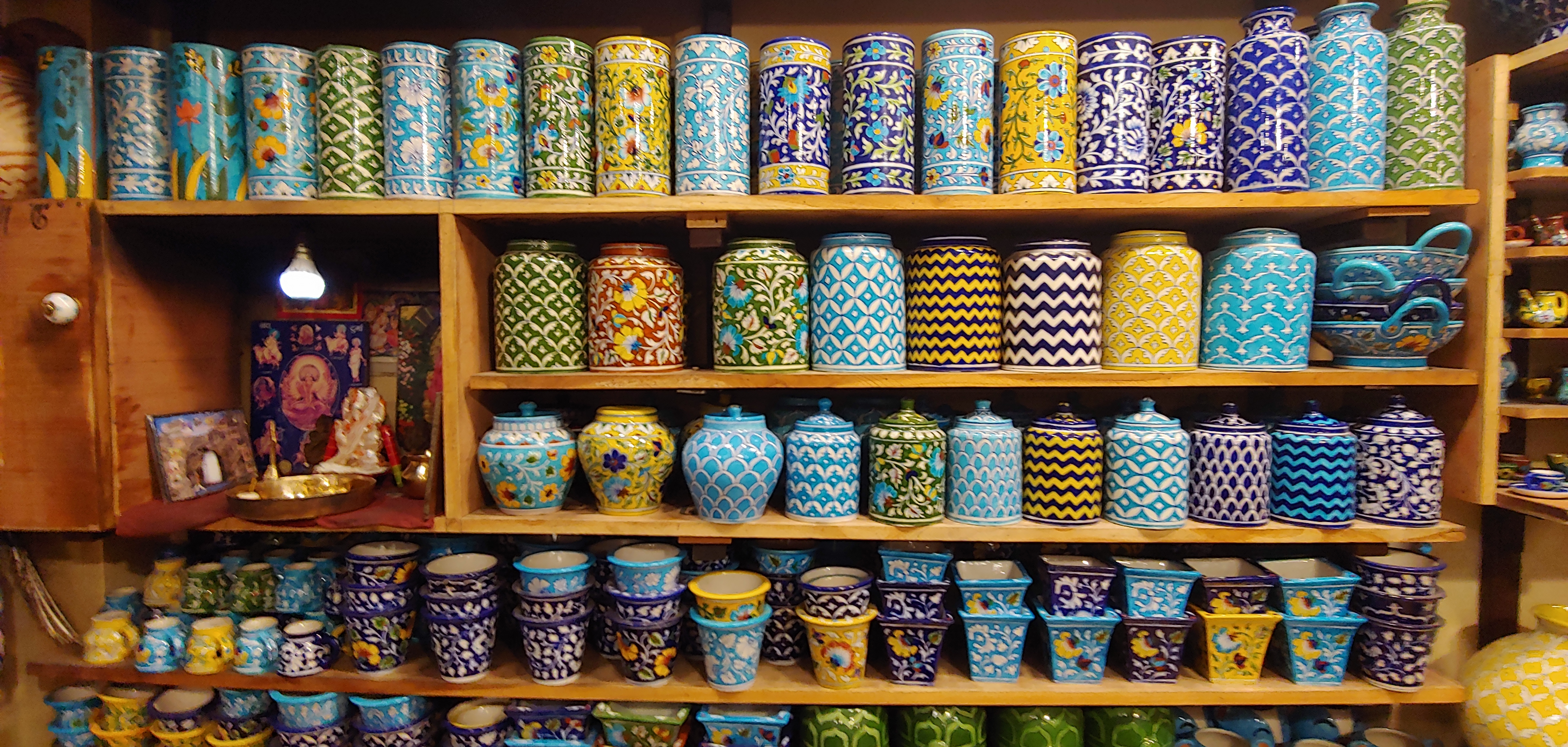
Fritware for sale in Jaipur

In 2011, 29 potteries, employing a total of 300 persons, making fritware were identified in Jaipur.

== Applications ==
Fritware served a wide variety of purposes in the medieval Islamic world. As a porcelain substitute, the fritware technique was used to craft bowls, vases, and pots, not only as symbols of luxury but also to practical ends. It was similarly used by medieval tilemakers to craft strong tiles with a colourless body that provided a suitable base for underglaze and decoration. Fritware was also known to be used to craft objects beyond pottery and tiling, and has been found to be used in the twelfth century to make objects like chess sets. There is also a tradition of using fritware to create intricate figurines, with surviving examples from the Seljuk Empire.

It was also used as the ceramic body for Islamic lustreware, a technique that puts a lustre ceramic glaze onto pottery.

== Blue pottery ==
A small manufacturing cluster of fritware exists around Jaipur, Rajasthan in India, where it is known as 'Blue Pottery' due its most popular glaze. The Blue Pottery of Jaipur technique may have arrived in India with the Mughals, with production in Jaipur dating to at least as early as the 17th century.
