= Influx =

Influx or in flux may refer to:

- Flux (biology) of ions, molecules or other substances from the extracellular space to the intracellular space
- Influx, a 2014 science-fiction novel by Daniel Suarez
- Influx (album), an album by Janus
- In Flux, a 1005 album by Ravi Coltrane
- "Influx", a song by Higher Intelligence Agency from their Colourform album
- InfluxDB, an open-source time series database
- Influx Press, an independent British publishing company

== See also ==
- Efflux (disambiguation)
- Inflow (disambiguation)
