= Frit =

Fused, quenched and granulated ceramic

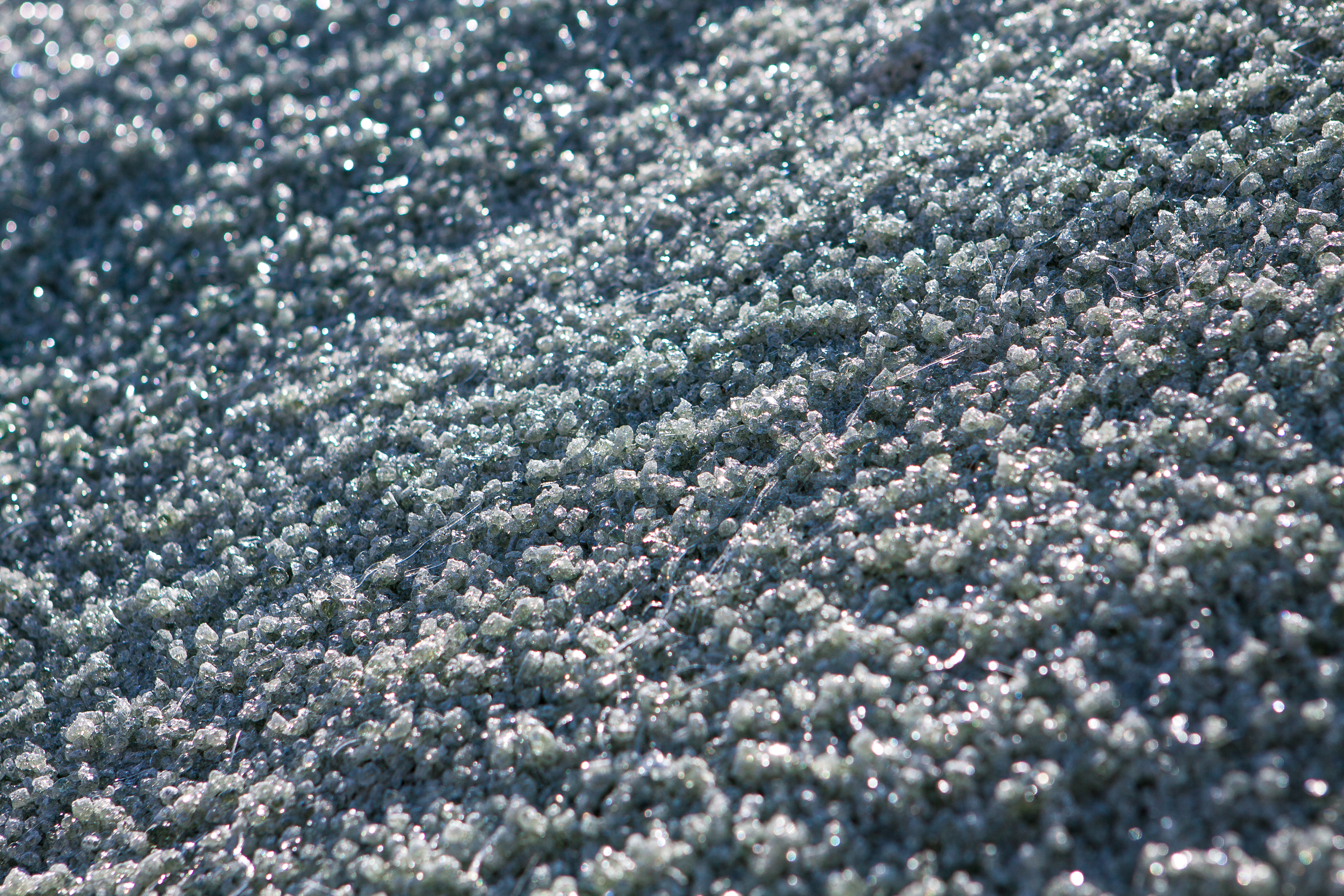
Frit

A frit is a ceramic composition that has been fused, quenched, and granulated. Frits form an important part of the batches used in compounding enamels and ceramic glazes; the purpose of this pre-fusion is to render any soluble and/or toxic components insoluble by causing them to combine with silica and other added oxides. However, not all glass that is fused and quenched in water is frit, as this method of cooling down very hot glass is also widely used in glass manufacture.

According to the Oxford English Dictionary, the origin of the word "frit" dates back to 1662 and is "a calcinated mixture of sand and fluxes ready to be melted in a crucible to make glass". Nowadays, the unheated raw materials of glass making are more commonly called "glass batch".

In antiquity, frit could be crushed to make pigments or shaped to create objects. It may also have served as an intermediate material in the manufacture of raw glass. The definition of frit tends to be variable and has proved a thorny question for scholars. In recent centuries, frits have taken on a number of roles, such as biomaterials and additives to microwave dielectric ceramics. Frit in the form of alumino-silicate can be used in glaze-free continuous casting refractories.

== Ancient frit ==
Archaeologists have found evidence of frit in Egypt, Mesopotamia, Europe, and the Mediterranean. The definition of frit as a sintered, polycrystalline, unglazed material can be applied to these archaeological contexts. It is typically colored blue or green.

=== Blue frit ===
Blue frit, also known as Egyptian blue, was made from quartz, lime, a copper compound, and an alkali flux, all heated to a temperature between 850 and 1000 °C. Quartz sand may have been used to contribute silica to the frit. The copper content must be greater than the lime content in order to create a blue frit. Ultimately the frit consists of cuprorivaite (CaCuSi_{4}O_{10}) crystals and "partially reacted quartz particles bonded together" by interstitial glass. Despite an argument to the contrary, scientists have found that, regardless of alkali content, the cuprorivaite crystals develop by "nucleation or growth within a liquid or glass phase". However, alkali content—and the coarseness of the cuprorivaite crystals—contribute to the shade of blue in the frit. High alkali content will yield "a large proportion of glass". thereby diluting the cuprorivaite crystals and producing lighter shades of blue. Regrinding and resintering the frit will create finer cuprorivaite crystals, also producing lighter shades.

The earliest appearance of blue frit is as a pigment on a tomb painting at Saqqara dated to 2900 BC, though its use became more popular in Egypt around 2600 BC. Blue frit has also been uncovered in the royal tombs at Ur from the Early Dynastic III period. Its use in the Mediterranean dates to the Thera frescoes from the Late Middle Bronze Age.

While the glass phase is present in blue frits from Egypt, scientists have not detected it in blue frits from the Near East, Europe, and the Aegean. Natural weathering, which is also responsible for the corrosion of glasses and glazes from these three regions, is the likely reason for this absence.

At Amarna, archaeologists have found blue frit in the form of circular cakes, powder residues, and vessel fragments. Analysis of the microstructures and crystal sizes of these frits has allowed Hatton, Shortland, and Tite to deduce the connection among the three materials. The cakes were produced by heating the raw materials for frit, then they were ground to make powders, and finally, the powders were molded and refired to create vessels.

In On Architecture, the first century BC writer Vitruvius reports the production of 'caeruleum' (a blue pigment) at Pozzuoli, made by a method used in Alexandria, Egypt. Vitruvius lists the raw materials for caeruleum as sand, copper filings, and 'nitrum' (soda). In fact, analysis of some frits that date to the time of Thutmose III and later show the use of bronze filings instead of copper ore.

Stocks suggests that waste powders from the drilling of limestone, combined with a minor concentration of alkali, may have been used to produce blue frits. The powders owe their copper content to the erosion of the copper tubular drills used in the drilling process. However, the archaeological record has not yet confirmed such a relationship between these two technologies.

=== Green frit ===
Evidence of the use of green frit is so far confined to Egypt. Alongside malachite, green frit was usually employed as a green pigment. Its earliest occurrence is in tomb paintings of the 18th dynasty, but its use extends at least to the Roman period. The manufacture of green and blue frit relies on the same raw materials, but in different proportions. To produce green frit, the lime concentration must outweigh the copper concentration. The firing temperature required for green frit may be slightly higher than that of blue frit, in the range of 950 to 1100 °C. The ultimate product is composed of copper-wollastonite ([Ca,Cu]_{3}Si_{3}O_{9}) crystals and a "glassy phase rich in copper, sodium, and potassium chlorides". In certain circumstances (the use of a two-step heating process, the presence of hematite), scientists were able to make a cuprorivaite-based blue frit that later became a copper-wollastonite-based green frit at a temperature of 1050 °C. On some ancient Egyptian wall paintings, pigments that were originally blue are now green: the blue frit can "devitrify" so that the "copper wollastonite predominates over the lesser component of cuprorivaite". As with blue frit, Hatton, Shortland, and Tite have analyzed evidence for green frit at Amarna in the form of cakes, powders, and one vessel fragment and inferred the sequential production of the three types of artifacts.

== Relationships with glass and faience ==
An Akkadian text from Assurbanipal's library at Nineveh suggests that a frit-like substance was an intermediate material in the production of raw glass. This intermediate step would have followed the grinding and mixing of the raw materials used to make glass. An excerpt of Oppenheim's translation of Tablet A, Section 1 of the Nineveh text reads:

You keep a good and smokeless fire burning until the 'metal' [molten glass] becomes fritted. You take it out and allow it to cool off.

The steps that follow involve reheating, regrinding and finally gathering the powder in a pan. Following the Nineveh recipe, Brill was able to produce a "high quality" glass. He deduced that the frit intermediate is necessary so that gases will evolve during this stage and the end product will be virtually free of bubbles. Furthermore, grinding the frit actually expedites the "second part of the process, which is to ... reduce the system to a glass".

Moorey has defined this intermediate step as "fritting", "a process in which the soluble salts are made insoluble by breaking down the carbonates, etc. and forming a complex mass of sintered silicates". A frit preserved in a "fritting pan fragment" kept in the Petrie Museum "shows numerous white flecks of unreacted silica and a large number of vesicles where gases had formed". The process was known to ancient writers Pliny and Theophilus.

But whether this "fritting" was done in antiquity as a deliberate step in the manufacture of raw glass remains questionable. The compositions of frits and glasses recovered from Amarna do not agree in a way that would imply frits were the immediate precursors of glasses: the frits have lower concentrations of soda and lime and higher concentrations of cobalt and alumina than the glasses have.

Scholars have suggested several potential connections between frit and faience. Kühne proposes that frit may have acted as the "binding agent for faience" and suggests that this binder was composed predominantly of silica, alkali and copper with minor concentrations of alkali earths and tin. But analysis of a wide array of Egyptian frits contradicts the binder composition that Kühne offers. Vandiver and Kingery argue that one method of producing a faience glaze was to "frit or melt the glaze constituents to form a glass", then grind the glass and form a slurry in water, and finally apply the glaze "by dipping or painting." However, their use of "frit" as virtually synonymous with "melt" represents yet another unique take on what a "frit" would constitute. Finally, Tite et al. report that frits, unusually colored blue by cobalt, found in "fritting pans" at Amarna have compositions and microstructures similar to that of vitreous faience, a higher-temperature form of Egyptian faience that incorporated cobalt into its body. In their reconstruction of the manufacture of vitreous faience, Tite et al. propose that the initial firing of raw materials at 1100–1200 °C produces a cobalt-blue frit, which is then ground, molded, and glazed.

In general, frits, glasses and faience are similar materials: they are all silica-based but have different concentrations of alkali, copper and lime. However, as Nicholson states, they are distinct materials because "it would not be possible to turn faience into frit or frit into glass simply by further, or higher temperature, heating".

The use of frit as pigments and as entire objects does give credence to the idea that frit-making was, to some extent, a "specialized" industry. Indeed, scientists have determined that frit objects, such as amulets, beads and vessels, have chemical compositions similar to those of powder frits designed for use as pigments. Nevertheless, determining the exact technical relationships among the frit, glass and faience industries is an area of current and, likely, future scholarly interest. The excavations at Amarna offer a spatial confirmation of these potential relationships, as the frit, glass and faience industries there were located "in close proximity" to one another.

== Fritware ==
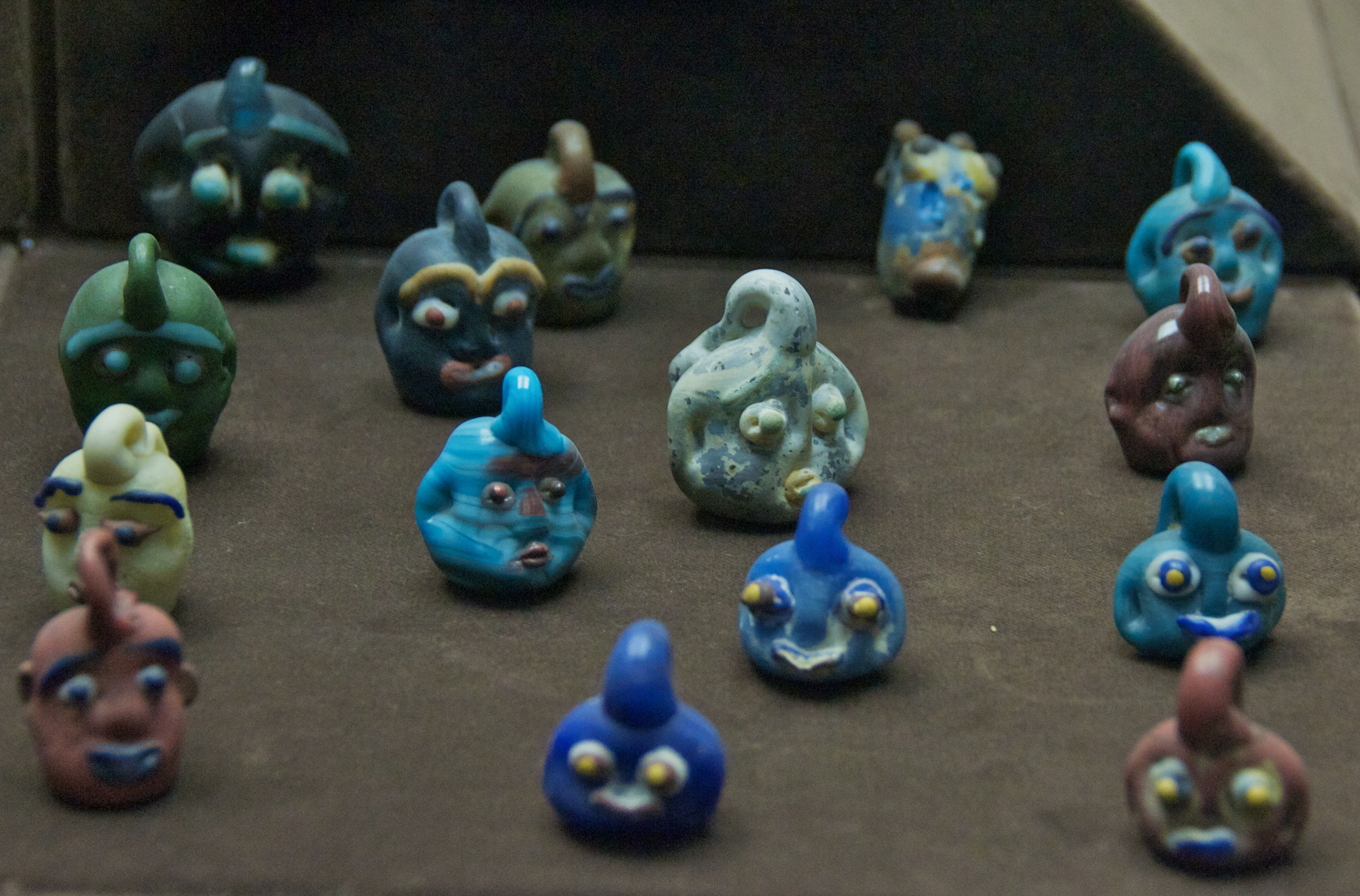
Objects in the shape of human heads, hand-made of frit, in the style of civilizations around the Black Sea, circa 5th century B.C., in the collection of the Glass and Ceramics Museum, Tehran, Iran

Fritware refers to a type of pottery which was first developed in the Near East, where production is dated to the late first millennium AD through the second millennium AD. Frit was a significant ingredient. A recipe for "fritware" dating to c. 1300 AD written by Abu’l Qasim reports that the ratio of quartz to "frit-glass" to white clay is 10:1:1. This type of pottery has also been referred to as "stonepaste" and "faience" among other names. A ninth-century corpus of "proto-stonepaste" from Baghdad has "relict glass fragments" in its fabric. The glass is alkali-lime-lead-silica and, when the paste was fired or cooled, wollastonite and diopside crystals formed within the glass fragments. The lack of "inclusions of crushed pottery" suggests these fragments did not come from a glaze. The reason for their addition would have been to release alkali into the matrix on firing, which would "accelerate vitrification at a relatively low firing temperature, and thus increase the hardness and density of the [ceramic] body". Whether these "relict glass fragments" are actually "frit" in the more ancient sense remains to be seen.

Iznik pottery was produced in Ottoman Turkey as early as the 15th century AD. It consists of a body, slip, and glaze, where the body and glaze are "quartz-frit". The "frits" in both cases "are unusual in that they contain lead oxide as well as soda"; the lead oxide would help reduce the thermal expansion coefficient of the ceramic. Microscopic analysis reveals that the material that has been labeled "frit" is "interstitial glass" which serves to connect the quartz particles. Tite argues that this glass was added as frit and that the interstitial glass formed on firing.

Frit was also a significant component in some early European porcelains. Famous manufacturers of the 18th century included Sèvres in France, and at Chelsea, Derby, Bow, Worcester and Longton Hall in England. Frit porcelain is produced at Belleek, County Fermanagh, Northern Ireland. This factory, established in 1857, produces ware that is characterised by its thinness, slightly iridescent surface and that the body is formulated with a significant proportion of frit.

A small manufacturing cluster of fritware exists around Jaipur, Rajasthan in India, where it is known as 'Blue Pottery' due its most popular glaze. The technique may have arrived in India with the Mughals, with production in Jaipur dating to at least as early as the 17th century.

== Modern frit ==
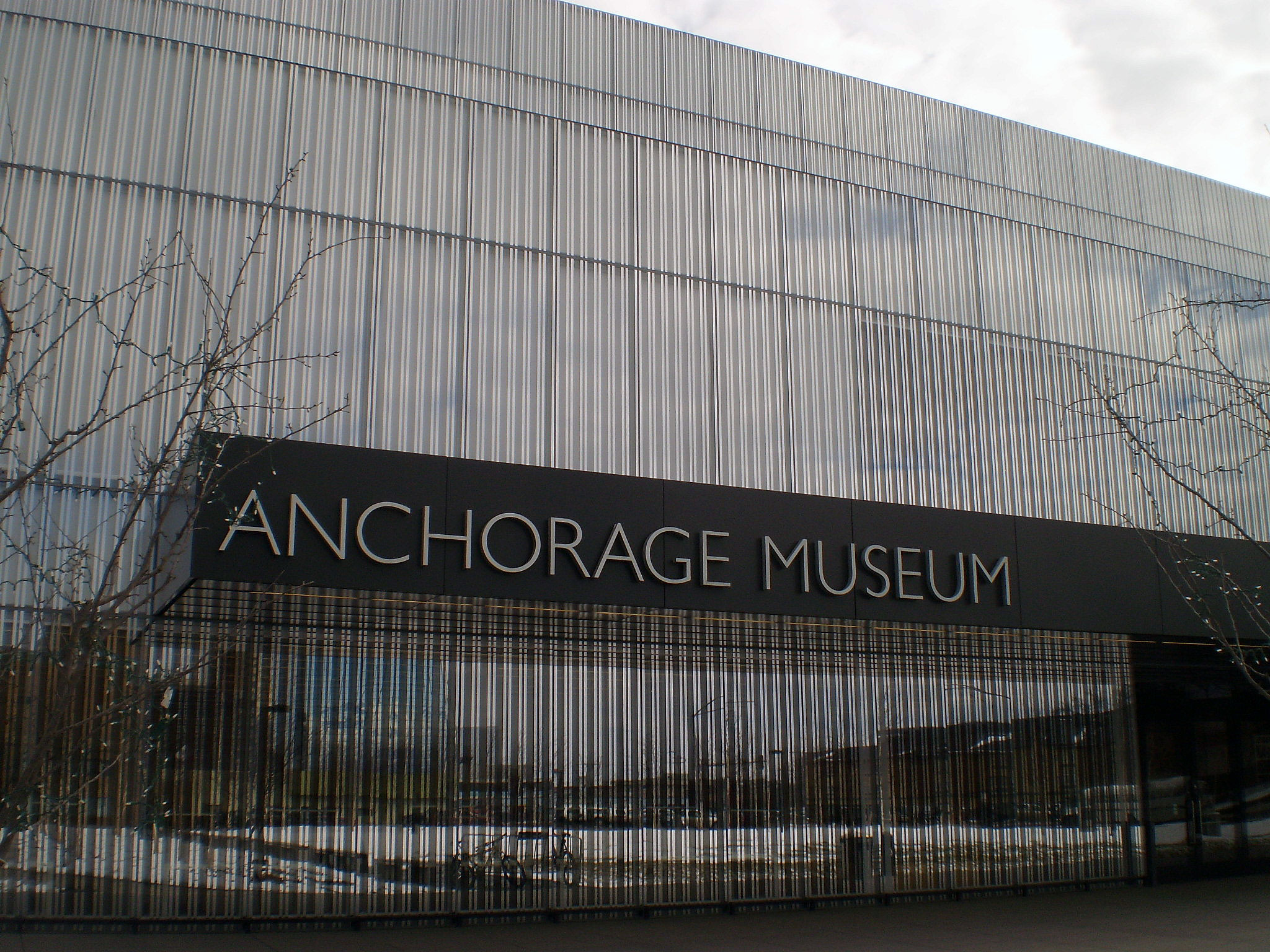
The facade of the Anchorage Museum in Anchorage, Alaska, incorporates a large amount of custom insulated fritted glass.

Frits are indispensable constituents of most industrial ceramic glazes which mature at temperatures below 1150 °C. Frits are typically intermediates in the production of raw glass, as opposed to pigments and shaped objects, but they can be used as laboratory equipment in a number of high-tech contexts.

Frits made predominantly of silica, diboron trioxide (B_{2}O_{3}) and soda are used as enamels on steel pipes. Another type of frit can be used as a biomaterial, which is a material made to become a part of, or to come into intimate contact with, one or more living organisms. Molten soda-lime-silica glass can be "poured into water to obtain a frit", which is then ground to a powder. These powders can be used as "scaffolds for bone substitutions". Also, certain frits can be added to high-tech ceramics: such frits are made by milling zinc oxide (ZnO) and boric acid (H_{3}BO_{3}) with zirconium (Zr) beads, then heating this mixture to 1100 °C, quenching it, and grinding it. This frit is then added to a lithium titanate (Li_{2}TiO_{3}) ceramic powder, which enables the ceramic to sinter at a lower temperature while still keeping its “microwave dielectric properties."

In laboratory and industrial chemical process equipment, the term frit denotes a filter made by the sintering-together of glass particles to produce a piece of known porosity referred to as fritted glass.

"In 1975, Shatterproof Glass Corporation received a patent for an oven door that incorporated ceramic frit coatings on the outer glass panel to help radiate heat away from the door while maintaining visibility."

Automotive windshields incorporate a dark band of ceramic dots around the edges called a frit.

In 2008, the Spanish ceramic frit, glaze and colours industry included 27 companies employing nearly 4,000 people with a combined annual turnover of approximately €1 billion. In 2022, the global market for ceramic frits was estimated to be worth a total of US$ 1.67 billion.

== See also ==
- Egyptian blue – Pigment used in ancient Egypt
- Egyptian faience – Type of Ancient Egyptian sintered-quartz ceramic
- Islamic pottery – Pottery of Islamic lands
- Iznik pottery – Type of decorated ceramic
- Contact fritting – Minimum electric current through a contact to break through the surface film resistance
