= Efflux =

Efflux may refer to:

- Efflux (microbiology), a mechanism responsible for moving compounds out of cells
- e-flux, a publishing platform and archive

== See also ==
- Efflux time, part of a measure of paint viscosity
- Flux (biology), movement of a substance between compartments
- Influx (disambiguation)
