= Lustreware =

Pottery with a reflective or iridescent surface

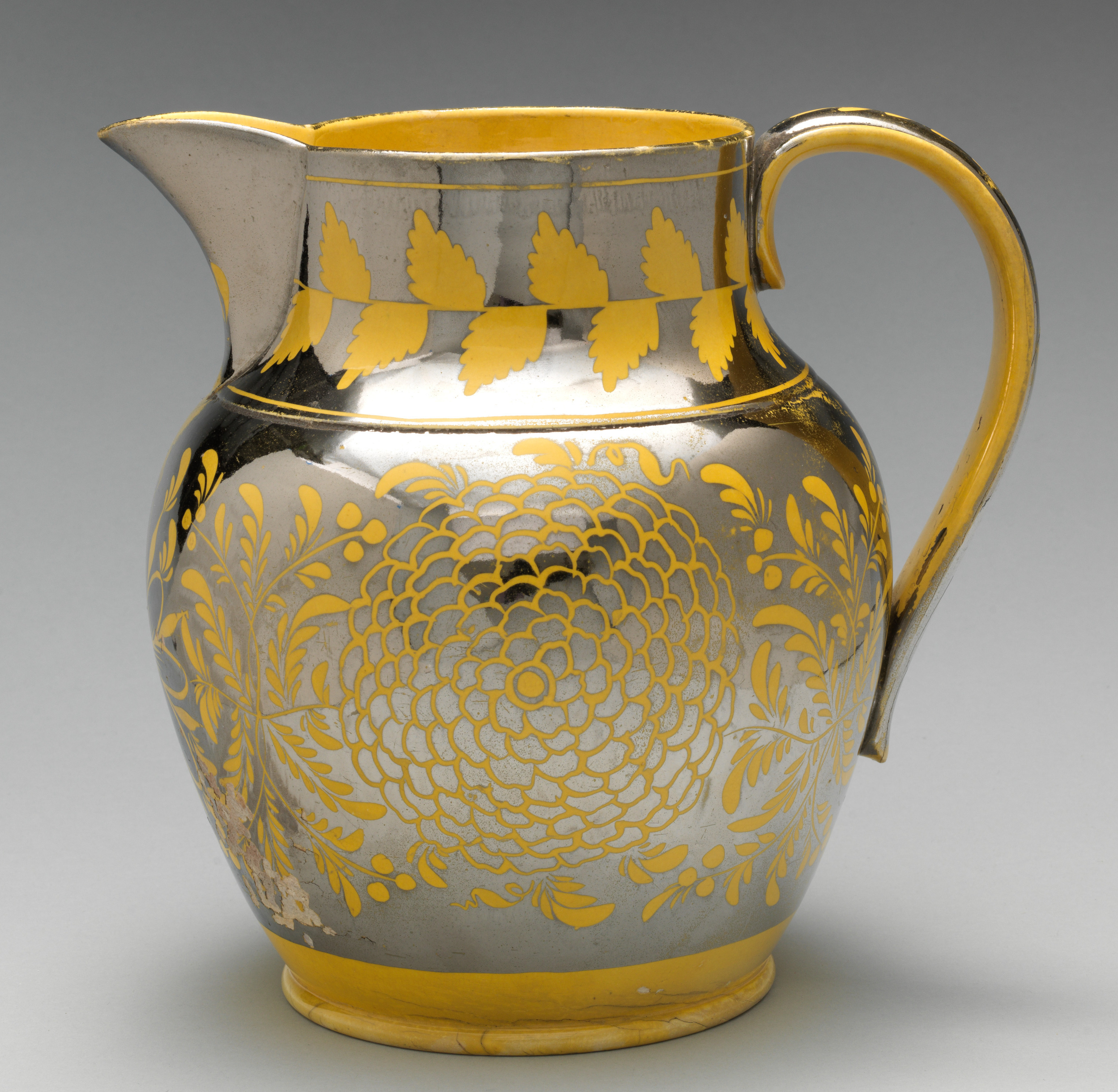
Staffordshire pottery jug, c. 1815

Lustreware or lusterware (the respective spellings for British English and American English) is a type of pottery or porcelain with a metallic glaze that gives the effect of iridescence. It is produced by metallic oxides in an overglaze finish, which is given a second firing at a lower temperature in a "muffle kiln", or a reduction kiln, excluding oxygen.

The technique of lustreware on pottery was first developed in Mesopotamia (modern Iraq) in the early 9th century. Initially mostly decorated with geometric patterns, by the 10th century an Iraqi style with the design dominated by one or two large figures developed. After the Fatimid conquest of Egypt in 969, it became a great centre of lustreware production until the Fatimid Caliphate fell in 1171, soon after the potter's quarter of the capital Fustat (Cairo) was burned in 1169. It is thought that the Fustat potters dispersed to both Syria and Persia, and lustreware appears there about this time; later the devastating conquests of the Mongols and Timur disrupted these industries. The technique had spread to al-Andalus (the Islamic Iberian Peninsula). Hispano-Moresque ware in lustre was mostly produced in Christian Spain, especially in the region of Valencia – in particular Manises – and later Barcelona.

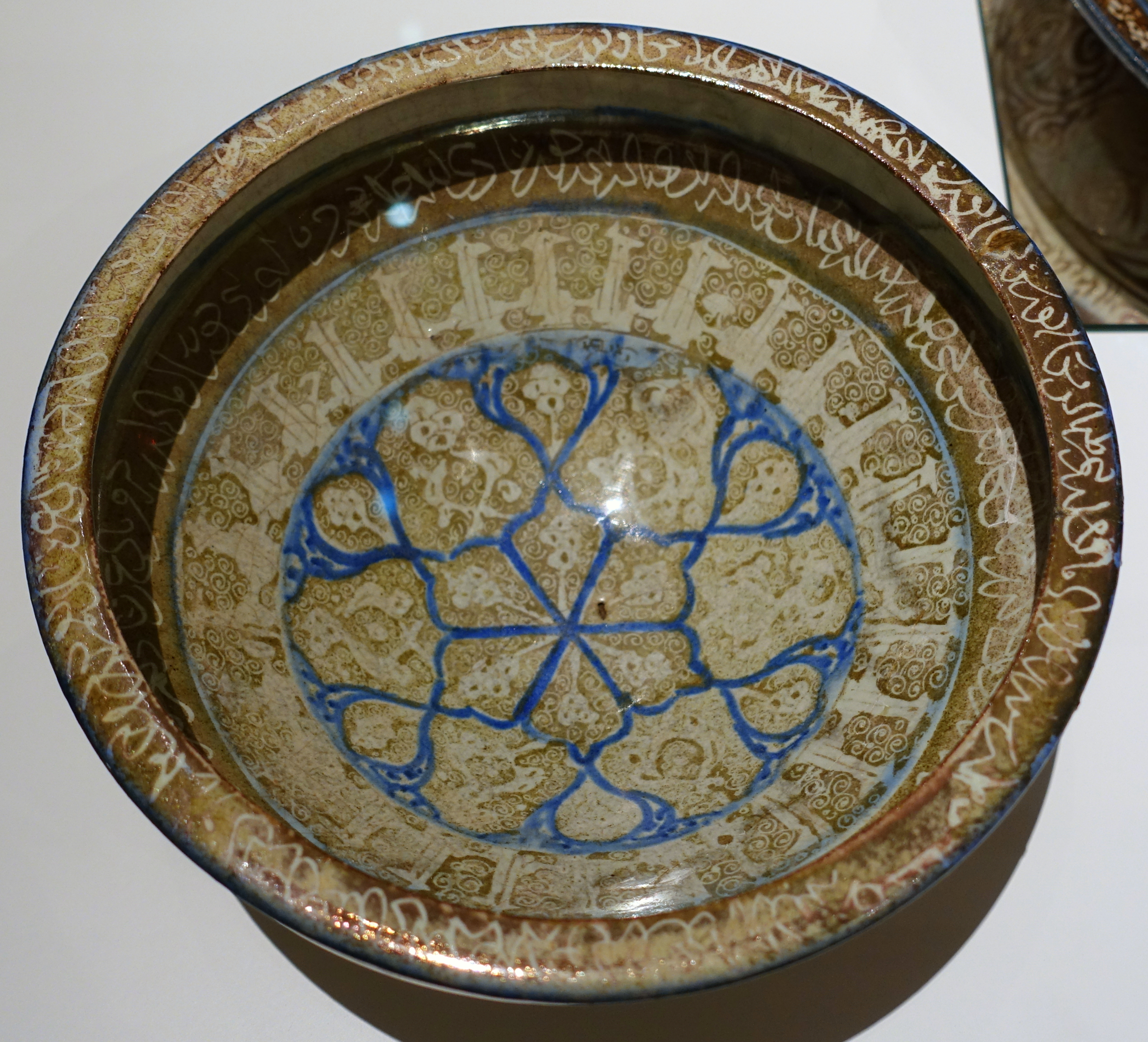
Fritware dish, Persia, 13th century

Lustre appears in Italian maiolica around 1500, and became a speciality of two relatively minor pottery towns, Gubbio, noted for a rich ruby-red, and Deruta. Around 1550 an even smaller town, Gualdo Tadino, also began to make some, for about a century, which was the last Renaissance lustre, Gubbio having stopped about 1570, and Deruta around 1630. There was a revival in England and other European countries in the late 18th century, when the techniques had largely to be reinvented, continuing into the 19th and beyond. Meanwhile, Persian lustre, after very little production since the 14th century, revived under the Safavids between about 1650 and 1750, for elegant vessels, especially vases and bottles, densely painted with plant-based designs.

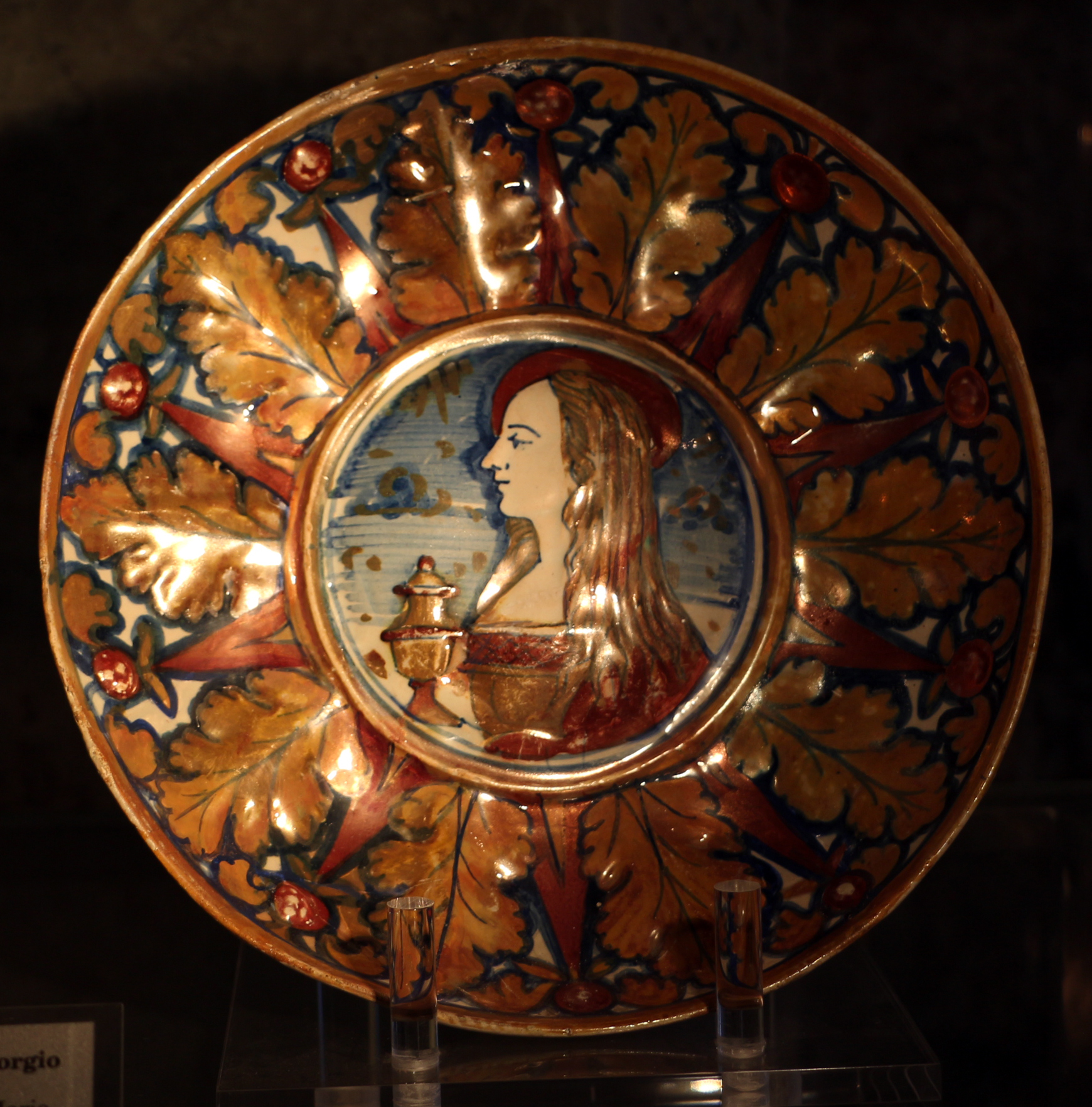
Mary Magdalene on Italian maiolica dish, Gubbio, 1530–1540

The lustreware effect is a final coating applied over the ceramic glaze, and fixed by a light second firing, applying small amounts of metallic compounds (generally of silver or copper) mixed with something to make it paintable (clay or ochre). This is then fired in a reducing atmosphere at a temperature high enough to "soften" the glaze from the first firing, and break down the metallic compounds, leaving a very thin ("perhaps 10 or 20 atoms thick") layer that is fused with the main glaze, but is mainly metal. Lustreware normally only uses one colour per piece, and the range is limited – a "gold" derived from silver compounds was historically the most common.

== Process ==
In the classical process to make lustreware, a preparation of metal salts of copper or silver, mixed with vinegar, ochre, and clay is applied on the surface of a piece that has already been fired and glazed. The pot is then fired again in a kiln with a reducing atmosphere, at about 600 °C. The salts are reduced to metals and coalesce into nanoparticles. Those particles give the second glaze a metallic appearance.

The process has always been expensive and rather unpredictable, always requiring two firings, and often the use of expensive materials such as silver and platinum. The very thin layer of lustre is often delicate, and many types of lustreware are easily damaged by scratching removing the metallic layer, or by contact with acids, probably over time even the mild acids in food. Lustreware has therefore always been for display and occasional rather than heavy regular use, although by the 19th century it could be relatively cheap. Many pieces show the lustre effect only working correctly on parts of the surface, or not at all. Apparently these were still regarded as fit for sale.

== Islamic lustreware ==
=== Precedents in glass ===
Lustre decoration was first used as a glass-painting technique. Lamm (1941) and Clairmont (1977) placed the origin of motifs appearing on lusterware decoration in Coptic Egypt, however, this hypothesis is disputed. Staining glass vessels with copper and silver pigments was known from around the 3rd century AD, although lustreware technology probably began sometime between the 8th and 9th centuries AD. The earliest recipe for luster production appeared in 8th century AD "Kitab al-Durra al-Maknuzna" by Jabir ibn Hayyan. Much of the knowledge of the behaviours of metallic compounds in turn came from metalworking, where cheaper substitutes for gold in gilding had been developed much earlier.

A fragment of lustre glass from Fustat is dated to the 779–780, and a bowl (Corning Museum of Glass) was made in Damascus between 718 and 814; otherwise we know little of the history of the technique on glass. Lustre was used in Islamic glass only briefly, and never spread to other areas as lustre on pottery did. A similar technique was used to make iridescent Art Nouveau glass, with more of a "rainbow" effect than a single shiny colour, from the late 19th century.

=== Mesopotamia ===
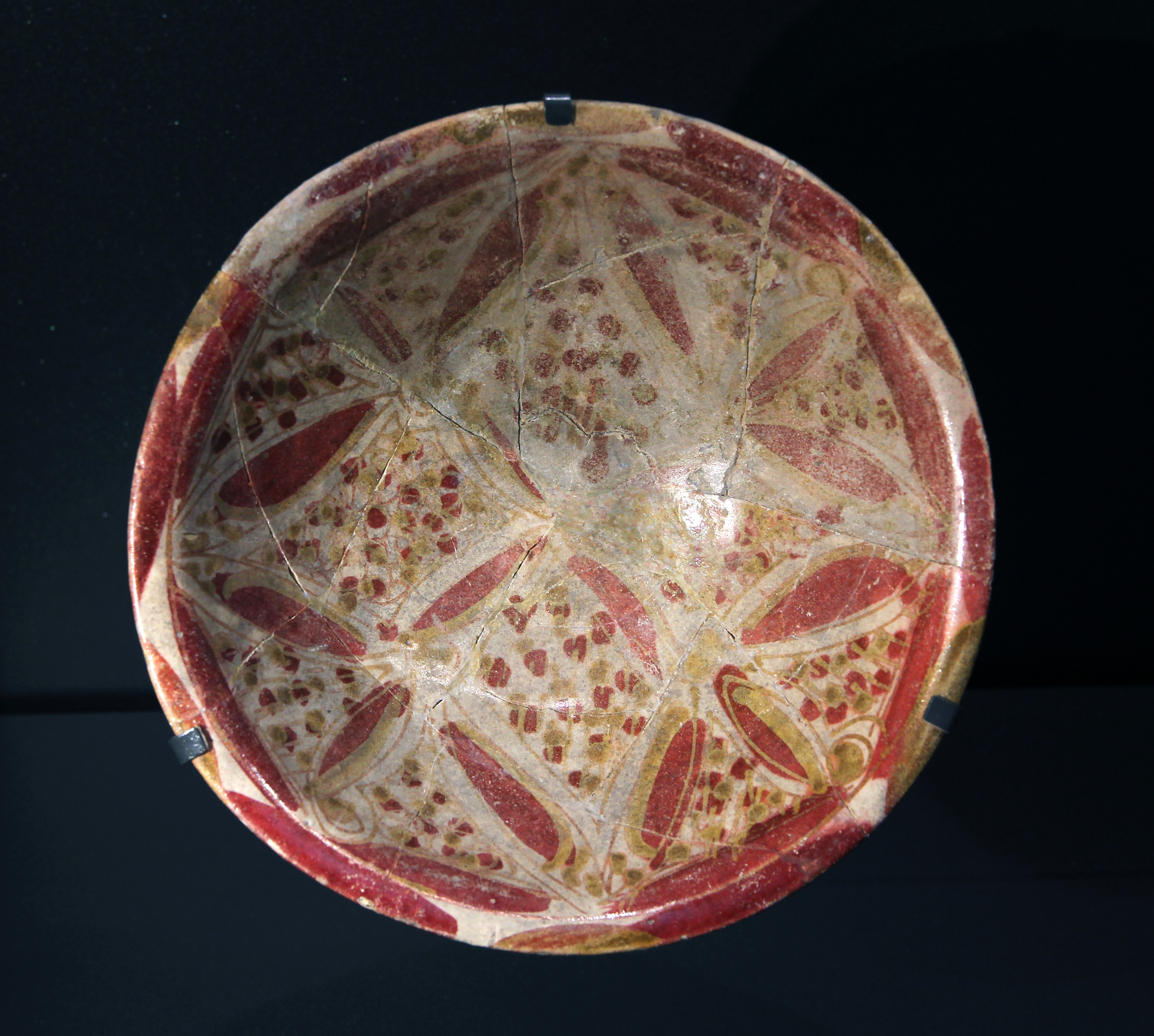
Bowl from Iraq, mid-800s. Lustre technique. Room 42–43, British Museum. 1956,0728.2

The first lustreware pottery was probably made under the Abbasid Caliphate in modern Iraq in the early 9th century, around Baghdad, Basra and Kufa. Most pieces were small bowls, up to about 16 cm wide, but fragments of larger vessels have been found, especially at the ruins of the Caliph's palace at Samarra, and in Fustat (modern Cairo). Fragments have been found as far away as Spain, North Africa, and Pakistan. Unlike the great majority of later lustreware, these very early pieces used three or four different lustre colours, from silver and copper compounds.

The earliest forms of lustreware were decorated with three to four colours, but as time went on the colours used was reduced to two. Recent studies have argued that the preference between polychrome and monochrome has to do with the price and availability of materials. This leads to more monochrome wares being produced over polychrome.

Early Islamic lustreware ceramics were predominately produced in Lower Mesopotamia during the ninth and tenth centuries. In the Great Mosque of Kairouan, Tunisia, the upper part of the mihrab is adorned with polychrome and monochrome lustreware tiles; dating from 862 to 863, these tiles were most probably imported from Mesopotamia. The reminiscence of shining metal, especially gold, made lustreware especially attractive. The bowls were painted with ornamental patterns and designs. Some pieces were signed by their makers, this acted as an indication of the admiration towards each craftsman. Trading in the Middle East was very popular.

Abbasid lustreware was traded within the Islamic world. The city of Baghdad, Iran and surrounding cities were part of the Silk Road economic system of trading during this period. There was a movement of goods generated between Iraq and China which triggered artistic emulations both ends, as well as some transfers of technologies, notably in the realm of ceramics.

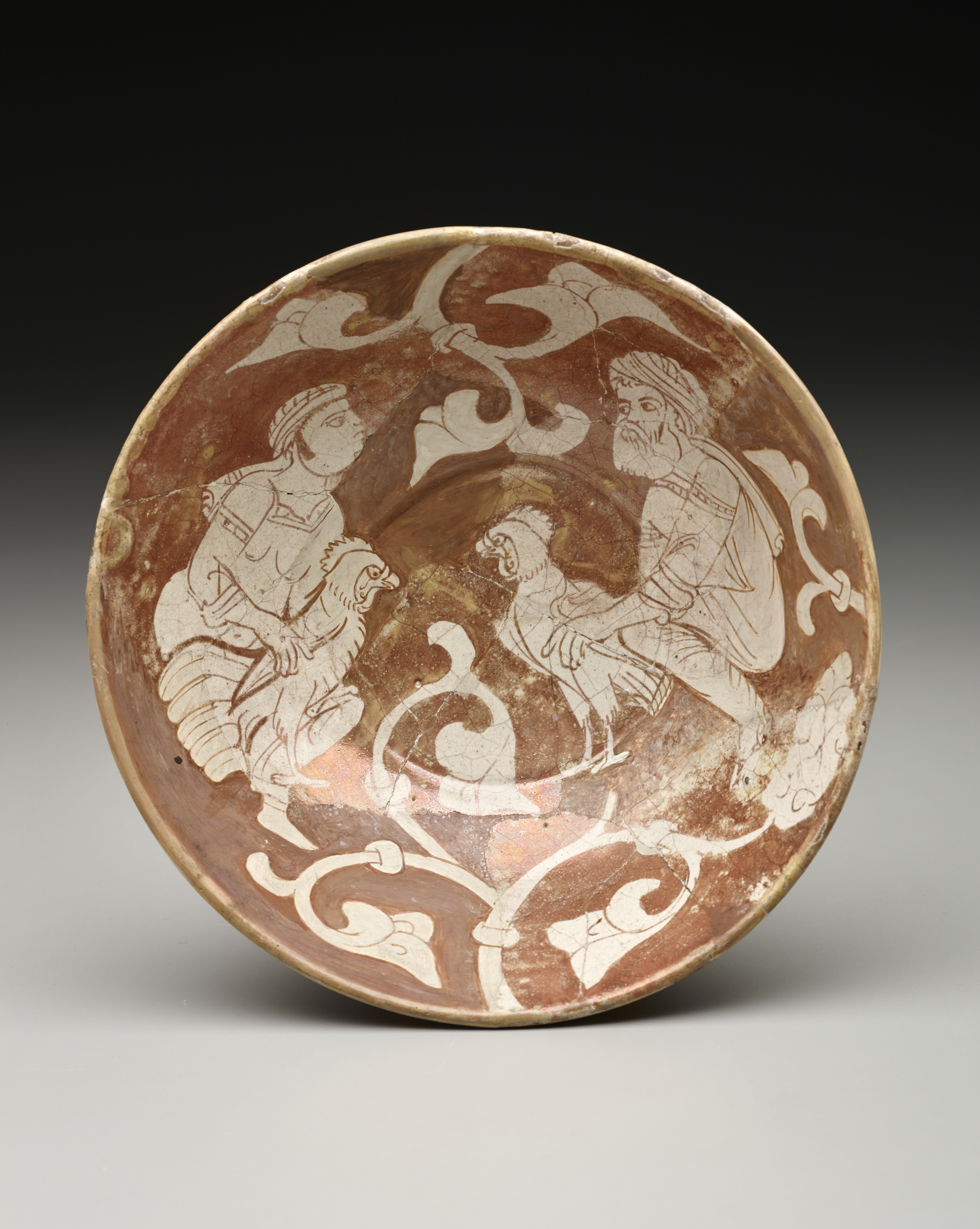
Fatimid Luster Plate with Cock Fight. Cairo, 11th–12th century. Keir Collection of Islamic Art

Some Abbasid lustreware can be differentiated by figural vs. vegetal design where some include icons and others show plant life. Some displayed both plants and figures. At this point in time, there was an aesthetic preference for completely covering the surface of objects with ornamental decoration, and this is also the case for lustreware ceramics. As lustreware made appearances in other cultures and countries, less decoration was introduced. Abbasid lustreware can either be polychrome, monochrome or bi-chrome when it comes to the colours featured in the ceramics. The polychrome and bi-chrome types are generally associated with the ninth century, while the monochrome type is associated with the late ninth or tenth century. The different colour types share the quality of the surfaces changing under different conditions. Abbasid potters would normally decorate polychrome bowls with vegetal and geometric patterns, while the monochrome bowls usually had large, centrally placed figures. They are visually sensitive and their appearance can change dramatically in particular conditions.

=== Fatimid Egypt ===
The Fatimid court in Egypt was large, rich, and extravagant, producing one of the great periods for lustreware, which was the only luxury type of pottery at the time. The clay-bodied earthenware used was "made from coarse clays" and mostly "fairly roughly made", but the best painting was very fine, and in the mature Fatimid style, characterised by "extraordinary liveliness". The painters may well have bought in standard glazed vessels made by others. The decoration was very varied, partly reflecting the mix of influences from the earlier Mesopotamian tradition, and the Fatimids' own origins to the West, in North Africa and Sicily, as well as the existence of a number of different workshops.

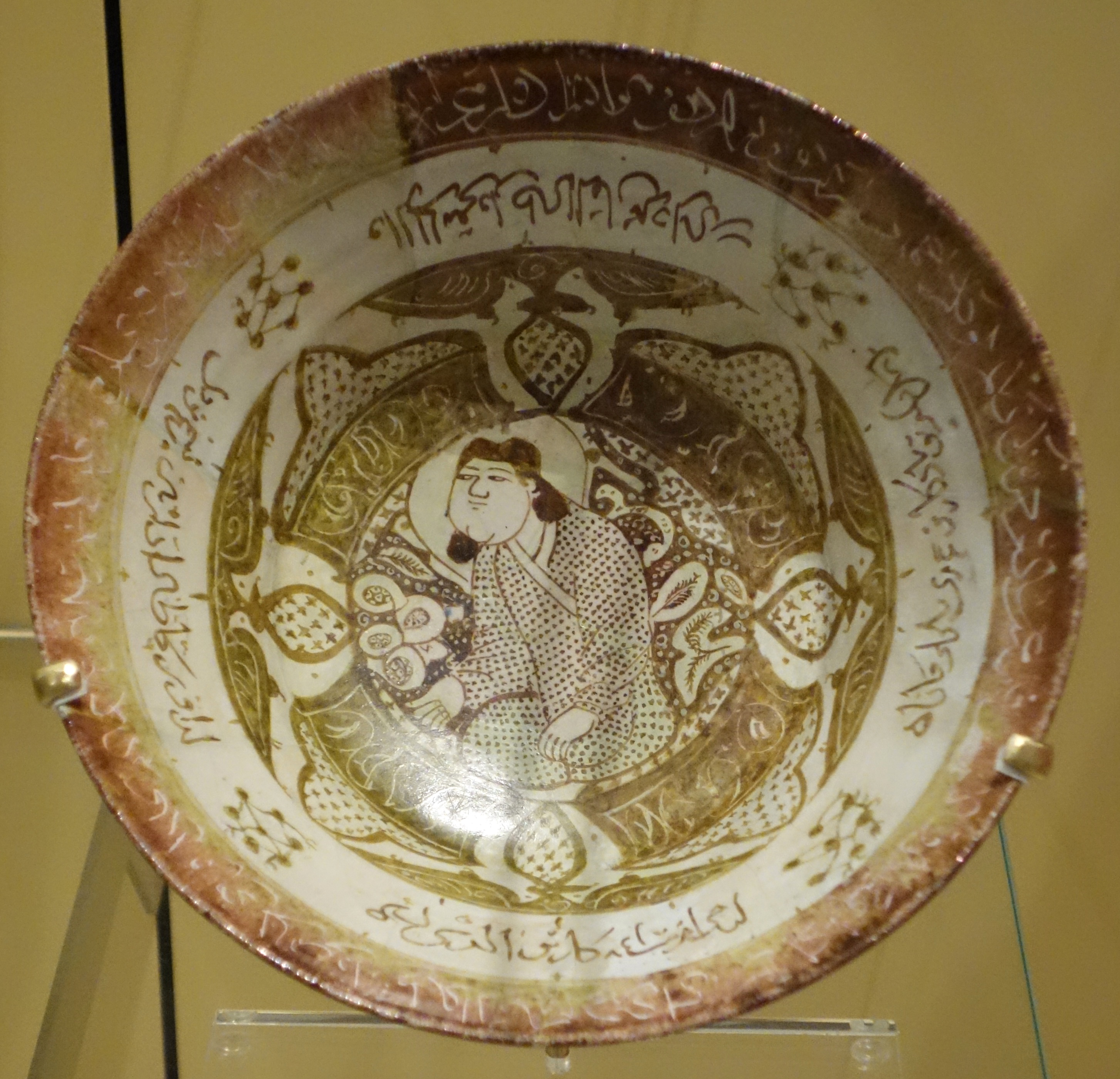
Bowl, Kashan, Iran, c. 1260–1280

Only two pieces are datable, by inscriptions naming the patrons, both to early in the period, to the reign of Caliph al-Hakkim, 996–1021, for whom one piece was made. At this period the style was still developing from earlier pieces, but a new style with brighter, warmer, colours was probably established by the mid-century. Gold, red and orange colours evoked the sun and were regarded as auspicious, as were some of the animals who were painted.

=== Persia ===
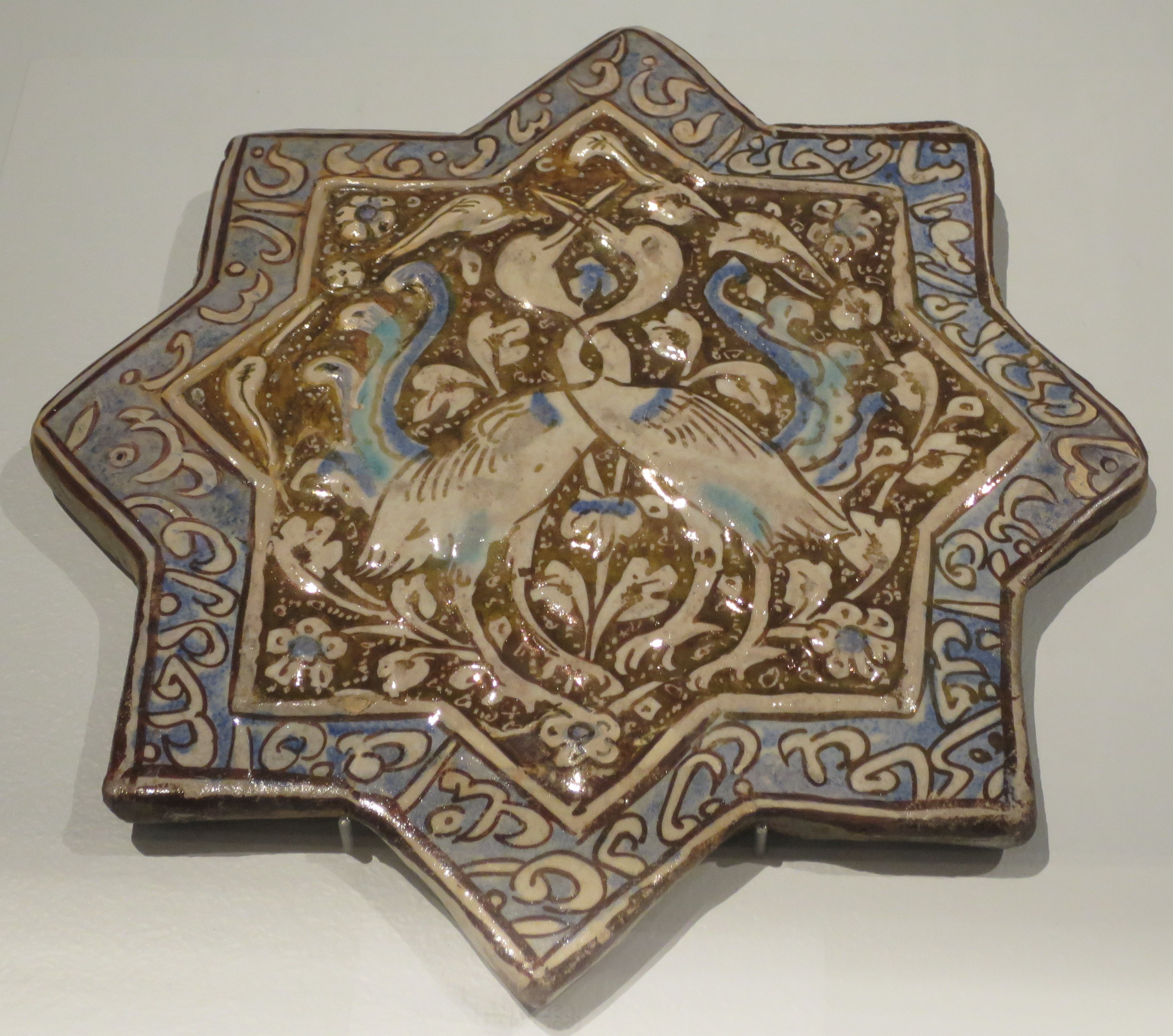
Ilkhanid star tile, Kashan, 13th–14th century, with entwined cranes

Lustreware began to be made in Persia when it was part of the Seljuk Empire, whose ruling dynasty and top elite were ethnically Turkish. But Persia was ruled by the Khwarazmian dynasty, initially as vassals of the Seljuk, until in 1190 they severed these ties and ruled independently until the devastating Mongol conquest beginning in 1219. The fifty years from 1150 saw great developments in Iranian ceramics. Firstly the fritware body and the glazes used on it were greatly improved, which allowed thinner walls and some of the translucency of Chinese porcelain, which was already imported into Persia, and represented the main competition for local fine wares. This "white ware" body was used for a variety of styles of decoration, all showing great advances in sophistication. Apart from lustreware, the most luxurious type was mina'i ware, which used polychrome overglaze enamelling, the first pottery to do so. This also required a light second firing; some pieces combined the two techniques. The earliest dated Persian piece with lustre is from 1179. Although an influx of craftsmen from Fustat is usually predicated, these may have been painters rather than potters, as local vessel shapes and the Seljuk "white ware" body are always used. The main colour of lustre paint used was gold; this needs to be distinguished from the overglaze application of gold leaf found in many later mina'i pieces.

Lustreware was certainly made in Kashan, and this may well be the only place of production (as it probably was for mina'i ware). Though the Mongol invasion, reaching Kashan in 1224, seems to have greatly reduced production until the 1240s, to judge by dated pieces, it continued, initially with little change in style. This was not the case for mina'i ware, which virtually disappears after 1219.

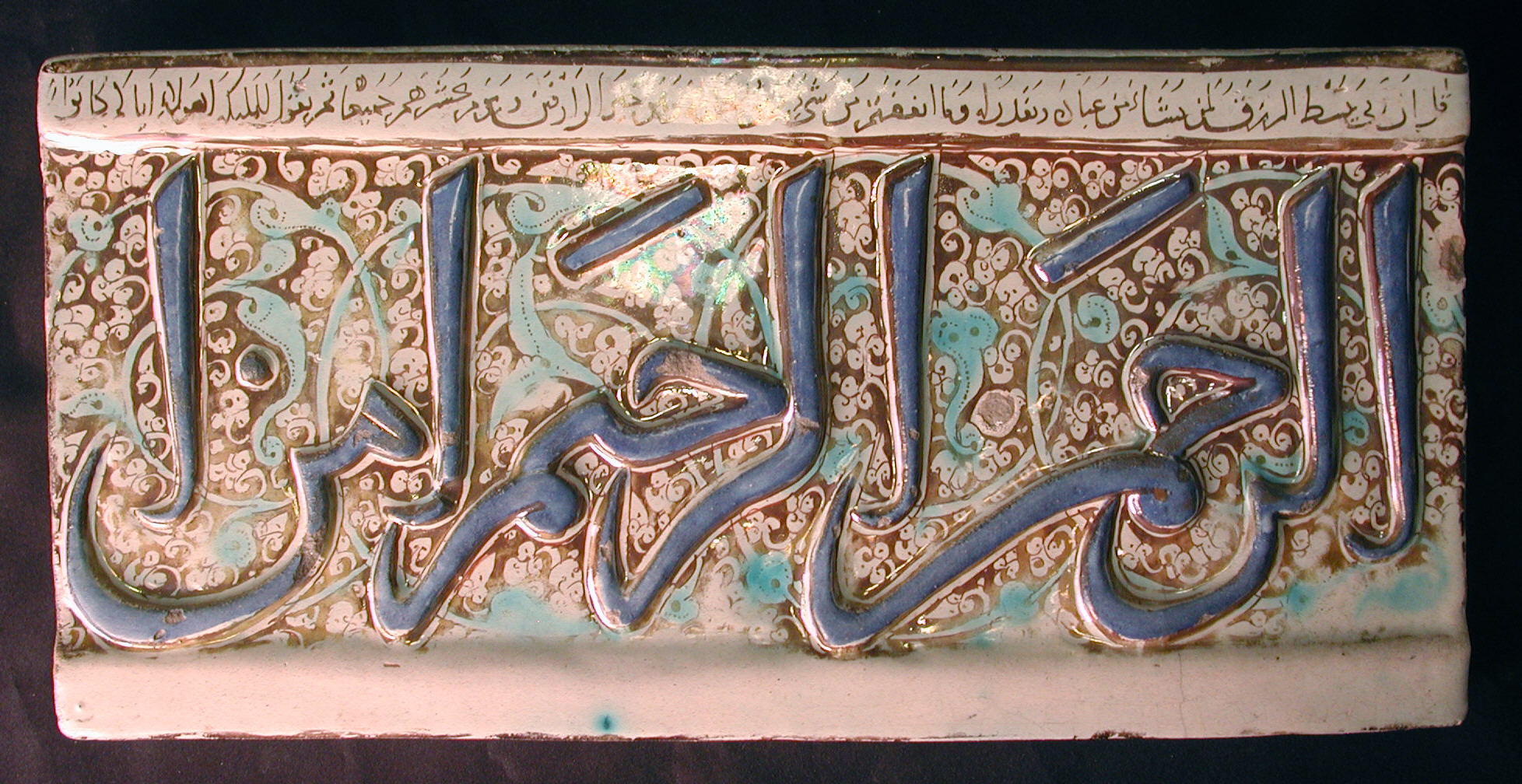
Early 14th-century tile with inscription: letters in underglaze cobalt blue, the arabesque background in lustre. Probably Kashan.

A large part of Persian lustreware production was in the form of tiles, usually star-shaped, with central animal or human figures, mostly single or in pairs, and ornament around the edges, and sometimes inscriptions. An eight-pointed star was the norm, made in effect of two rectangles with one rotated, but six-pointed stars are also common. To fill a space with tiles, eight-pointed stars fitted with crosses with pointed arms. These lacked a large central area and contained either just ornament, or a number of small figures, usually birds of animals. Square tiles and other shapes are also found. The tiles were evidently produced in large numbers (and cemented to walls have no doubt survived better than vessels in use), and kashi or kashani "became the usual Persian word for a tile". The painting usually combined cobalt blue underglaze painting with overglaze lustre, and that of the figures is often rather slapdash on tiles compared to that on vessels.

Tile and vessel production continued under the Mongol Ilkhanids, with some decline in the quality of the body, glaze, lustre finish and painting, the "drawing became slightly heavier, and the mood less lyrical". There is a gap in dated tiles between 1224 and 1250, and examples cease in 1339, around when lustre production seems to have ceased, perhaps partly because of the arrival of the Black Death in Persia. Lustre on vessels was already in decline from about 1300. The Ilkhanids were by then treating lustre "more as a rich accompaniment to other colours than as a dominant pigment on its own".

After a gap of several centuries in Persian production, it was revived in the Safavid period from about the 1630s, in a rather different style, typically producing small pieces with designs often in a dark copper colour over a dark blue (cobalt) background. Unlike other Persian wares of the period, these use traditional Middle Eastern shapes and decoration rather than Chinese-inspired ones, and also do not take their shapes from metalware. Designs featured plant forms and animals, and generally flowed freely over the whole surface, typically taking up over half the surface area. Production, which was never large, appears to have mostly been from about 1650 to 1750, but with rather inferior wares produced into the 19th century. It is often thought to have been centred in Kirman, though firm evidence is lacking.

=== Syria ===
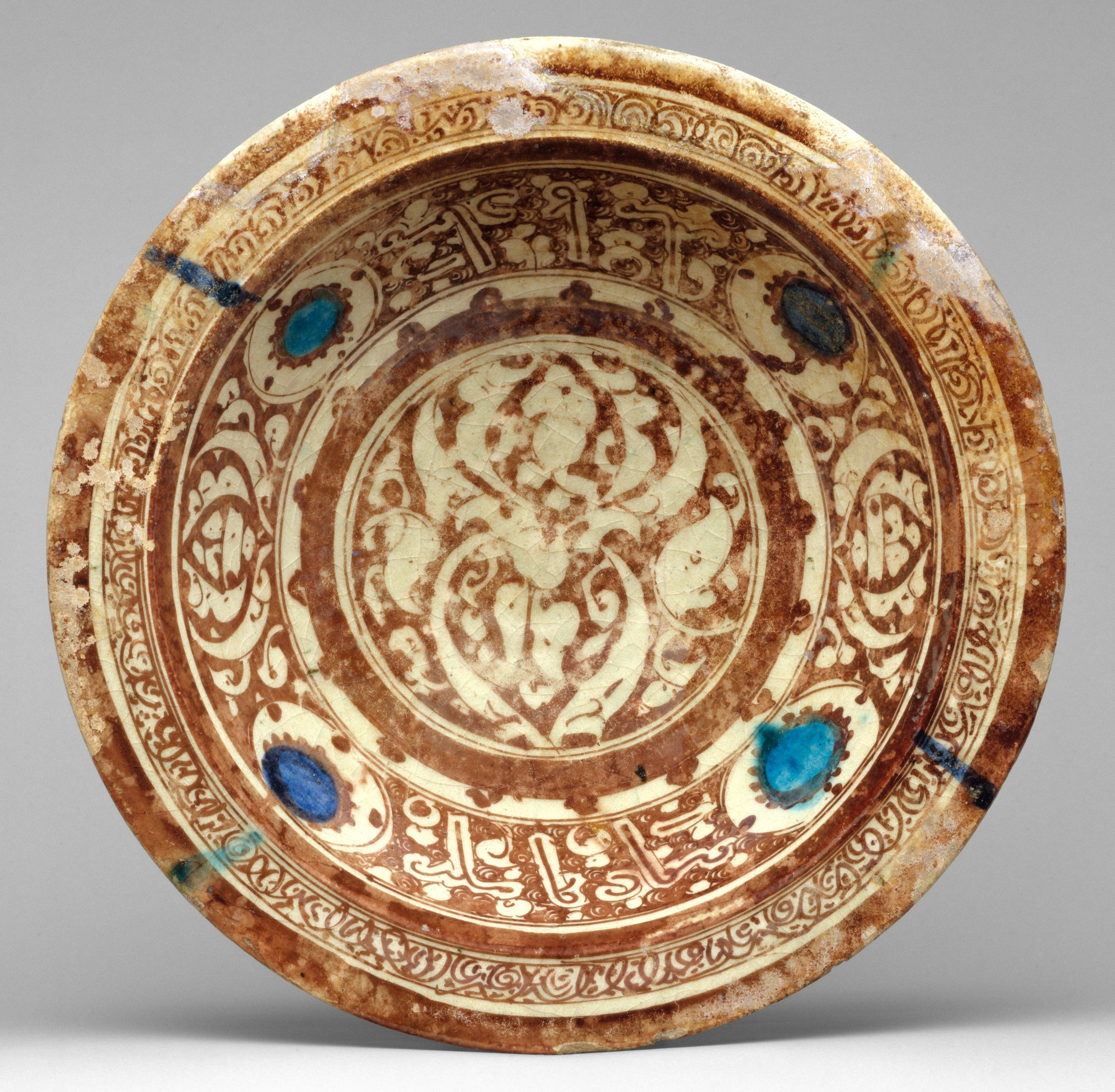
Bowl, Raqqa ware, Syria, around 1200

As in Persia, lustreware begins with the dispersal of Egyptian ceramic painters around 1170. The painting style continues to develop Fatimid styles and subjects, while the clay body and the vessel shapes are different, suggesting local potters worked with immigrant painters. This first type is known as Tell Minis ware, after the site where they were first excavated (but not necessarily where they were made). They begin near the end of the reign of Nur ad-Din of Aleppo (d. 1174), and the court may have deliberately fostered the bringing together of the craftsmen, perhaps including some from Persia. The designs are "mostly freely painted flowing compositions based on themes of good omen: sun-faces, fishes, crescent moons, figures of courtiers" and others.

Tell Minis ware ceases around 1200, which is about when a new and very different production began at Raqqa, lasting until the Mongols destroyed the city in 1259. Lustre was just one type of finish applied to some vessels from the usual types made there. In Raqqa ware the painting is mostly plant-based forms and inscriptions or "mock-lettering", geometrically structured to give "a dignified, monumental character". The wares do not seem to have a context in court patronage. The glazes were either clear, revealing an off-white body or white slip, or given various rather dark colours, usually thought to show later wares. The interplay between these dark glazes and lustre "made a world of shifting half-light, quiet and mysterious" that was probably influential on later Spanish and Italian wares with lustre over blue underglaze; some Syrian examples have been found in Europe.

After the fall of Raqqa the lustre technique later appeared in Damascus, until Timur sacked the city in 1401, bringing Syrian lustreware to an end. Damascus wares also reached Europe and in both Spain and Italy there are 15th-century documentary records describing local lustre wares by terms such as "a la domasquina... dauratos et de cafre argentatos" (a commission for a Manises potter, 1414). The similarities between Syrian and Spanish painting styles suggest some refugee painters may have reached Europe.

=== Islamic Spain ===
The expansion of lustreware to Western Europe can be attributed to the artisans of the Nasrid kingdom of Andalucía, the last Islamic stronghold in Western Europe situated in Spain. At the start of the thirteenth century, the differences in pottery between Christian and Muslim territories in Spain were drastically different. While the Muslim potters used techniques such as glazing, sgraffito, and lustreware, Christian pottery had minimal to no surface design. Additionally, the Muslim potters created a wide variety of ceramic goods ranging from toys to highly decorated jars, and the Christian potters stuck to plain vessel forms. At the beginning of the fourteenth century, Christian territories began adopting Muslim pottery techniques, including lustreware. Originating from Murcia and Malaga, Muslim lustreware potters in Spain had expanded their market across Europe by the late 14th century and were running a complex market of local, regional and exported goods. Referred to as obra de malica, or "Malaga work", their creations found a dedicated clientele among affluent families in Florence, Italy.

By the 15th century, Italian artisans acquired the techniques of lustreware production, yet the imported Islamic-Spaniard lustreware remained sought after, as Italian renditions were perceived as imitative of the Spanish imports. Nevertheless, towards the onset of the 16th century, Italian potters began infusing their own motifs and stylistic elements, beginning the golden era of Italian lustreware, known as Maiolica.

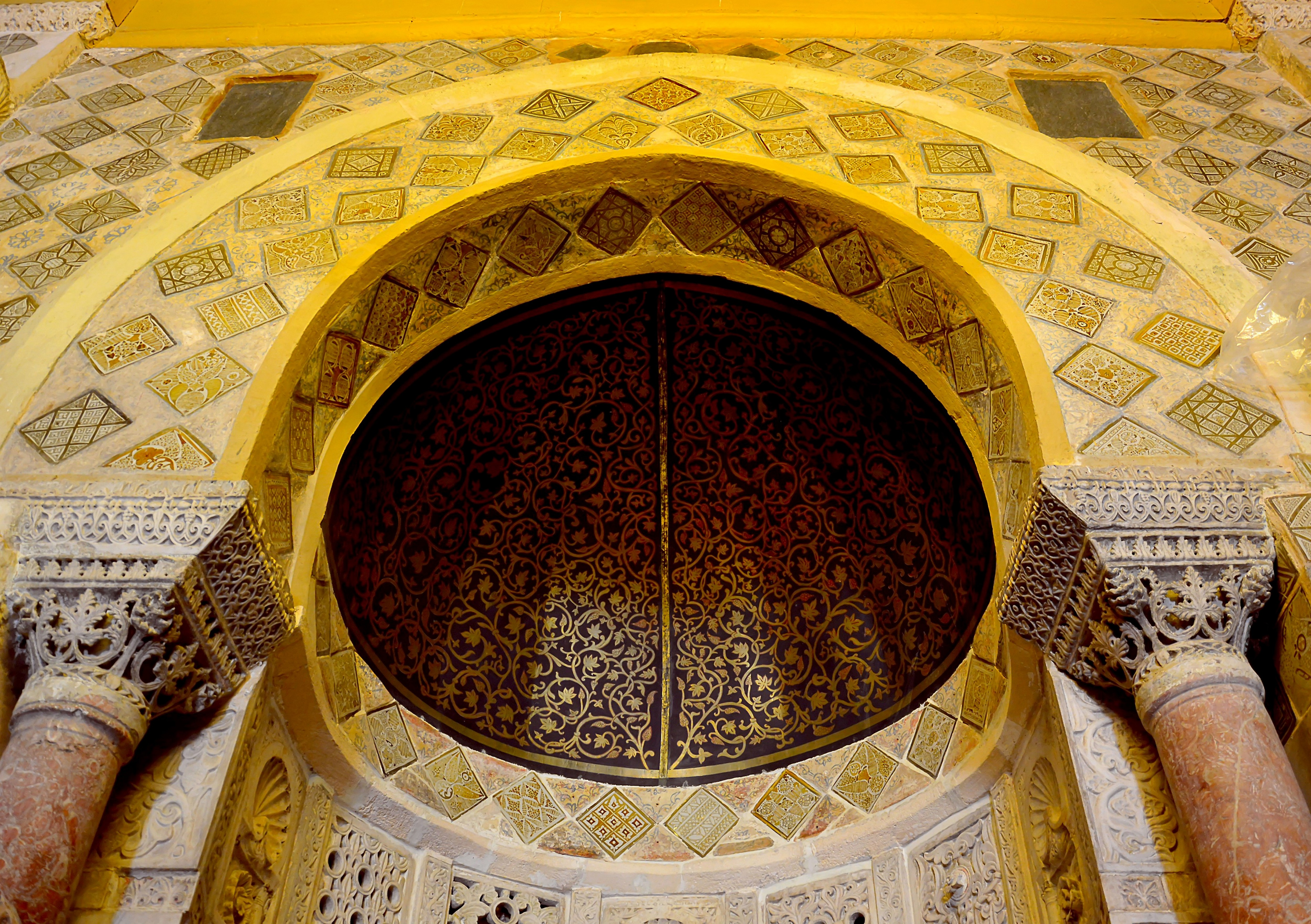
Mihrab with 9th century lustreware tiles, Mosque of Uqba (or Great Mosque of Kairouan), Tunisia

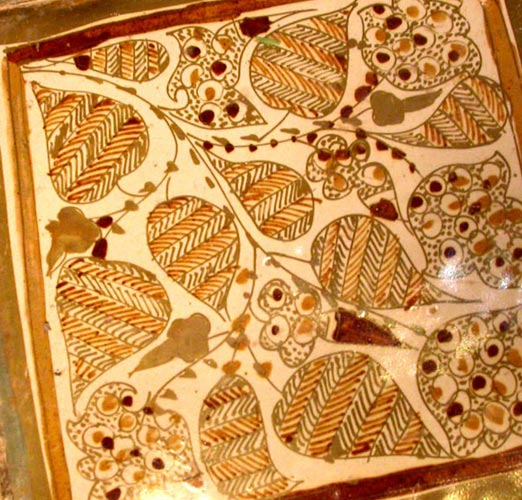
Single tile from the Kairouan mihrab

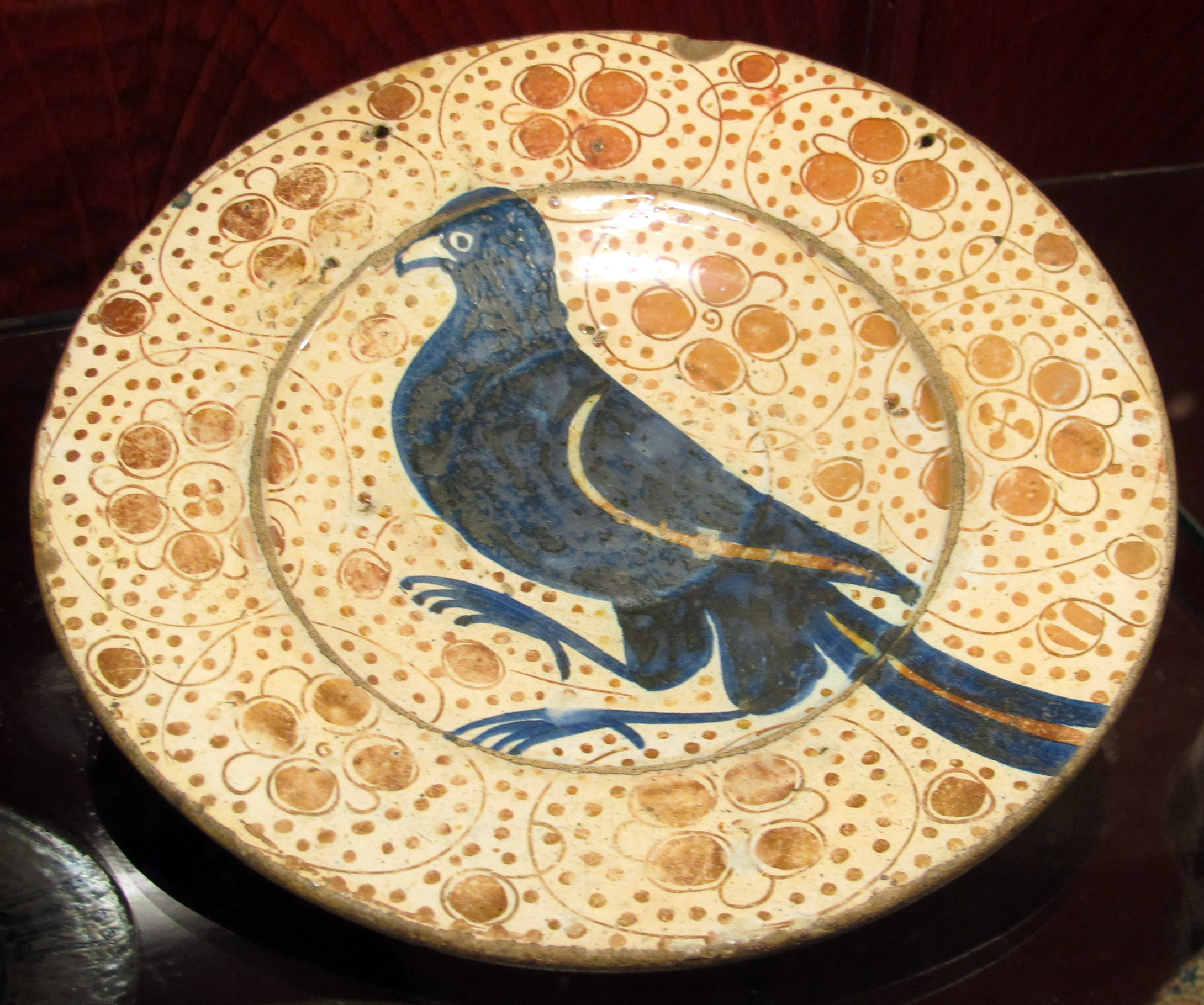
Hispano-Moresque dish, Manises, 1400–1460

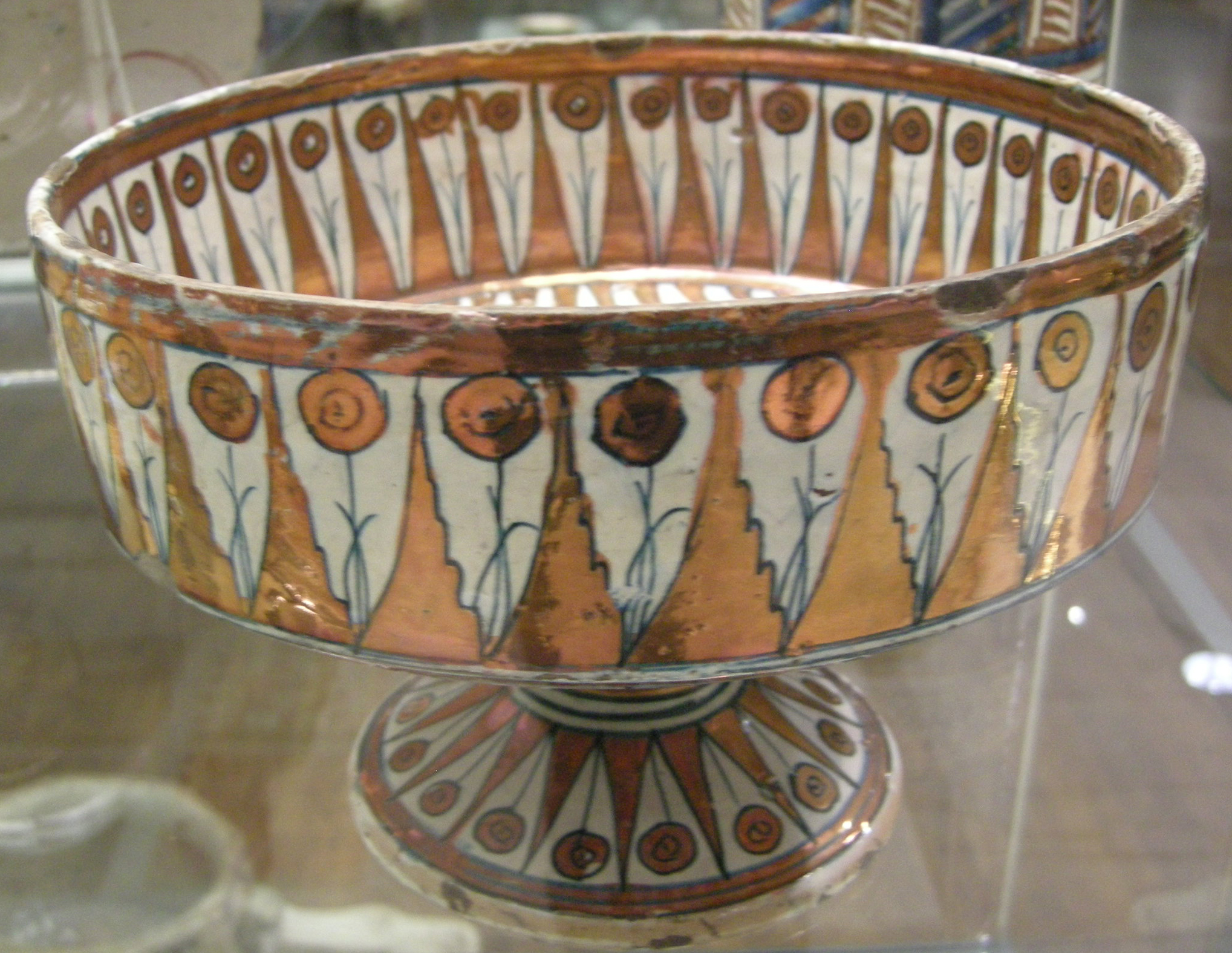
Hispano-Moresque bowl, Andalusia, 1500–1550

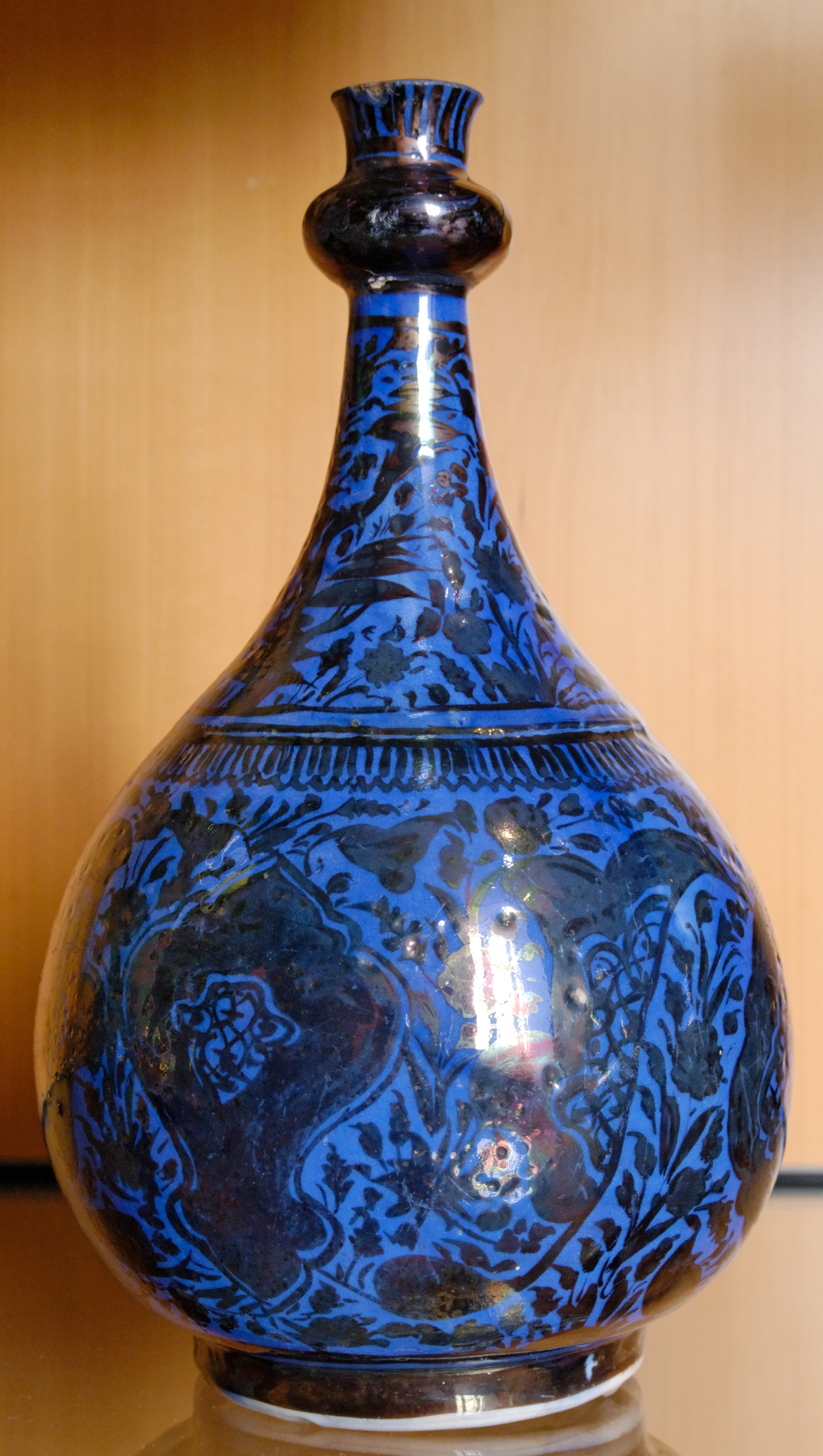
Safavid wine jug, Iran, 2nd half 17th century, probably originally with a set of matching cups

== Modern lustreware ==
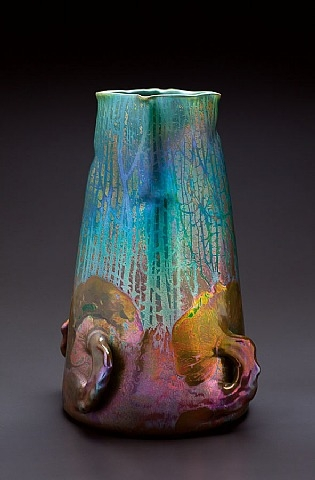
Lustreware vase by Clement Massier, circa 1900

Metallic lustre of another sort produced English lustreware, which imparts to a piece of pottery the appearance of an object of silver, gold or copper. Silver lustre employed the new metal platinum, whose chemical properties were analyzed towards the end of the 18th century, John Hancock of Hanley, Staffordshire invented the application of a platinum technique, and "put it in practice at Mr Spode's manufactory, for Messrs. Daniels and Brown", about 1800. Very dilute amounts of powdered gold or platinum were dissolved in aqua regia and added to spirits of tar for platinum and a mixture of turpentine, flowers of sulfur and linseed oil for gold. The mixture was applied to the glazed ware and fired in an enameling kiln, depositing a thin film of platinum or gold.

Platinum produced the appearance of solid silver, and was employed for the middle class in shapes identical to those uses for silver tea services, ca. 1810–1840. Depending on the concentration of gold in the lustring compound and the under slip on which it was applied, a range of colours could be achieved, from pale rose and lavender, to copper and gold. The gold lustre could be painted or stenciled on the ware, or it could be applied in the resist technique, in which the background was solidly lustred, and the design remained in the body colour. In the resist technique, similar to batik, the design was painted in glue and size in a glycerin or honey compound, the lustre applied by dipping, and the resist washed off before the piece was fired.

Lustreware became popular in Staffordshire pottery during the 19th century, where it was also used by Wedgwood, who introduced pink and white lustreware simulating mother of pearl effects in dishes and bowls cast in the shapes of shells, and silver lustre, introduced at Wedgwood in 1805. In 1810 Peter Warburton of the New Hall porcelain factory patented a method of transfer-printing in gold and silver lustre. Sunderland lustreware in the North East is renowned for its mottled pink lustreware, and lustreware was also produced in Leeds, Yorkshire, where the technique may have been introduced by Thomas Lakin.

Wedgwood lustreware made in the 1820s spawned the production of mass quantities of copper and silver lustreware in England and Wales. Cream pitchers with appliqué-detailed spouts and meticulously applied handles were most common, and often featured stylized decorative bands in dark blue, cream yellow, pink, and, most rare, dark green and purple. Raised, multicoloured patterns depicting pastoral scenes were also created, and sand was sometimes incorporated into the glaze to add texture. Pitchers were produced in a range of sizes from cream pitchers to large milk pitchers, as well as small coffeepots and teapots. Tea sets came a bit later, usually featuring creamers, sugar bowls, and slop bowls.

Large pitchers with transfer printed commemorative scenes appear to have arrived around the middle of the 19th century. These were purely decorative and today command high prices because of their historical connections. Delicate lustre imitating mother of pearl was produced by Wedgwood and at Belleek in the mid-century, derived from bismuth nitrate.

Under the impetus of the Aesthetic Movement, William de Morgan revived lustrewares in art pottery, drawing from lustred majolica and Hispano-Moresque wares, with fine, bold designs.

In the United States, copper lustreware became popular because of its lustrousness. As gaslights became available to the rich, the fad was to place groupings of lustreware on mirror platforms to be used as centrepieces for dinner parties. Gaslights accentuated their lustrousness.

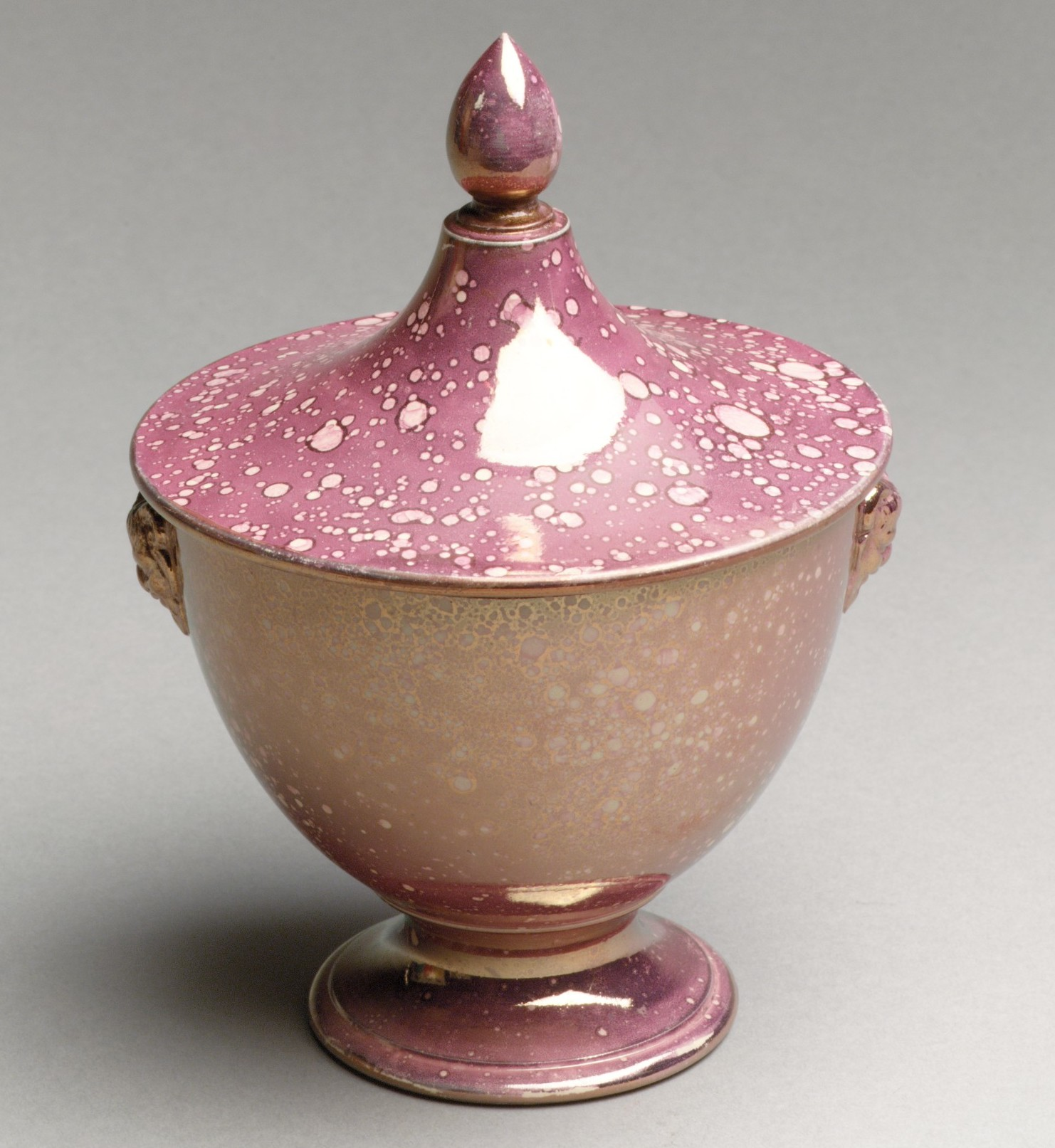
Sugar bowl from a coffee set, French faience from Sarreguemines, c. 1810

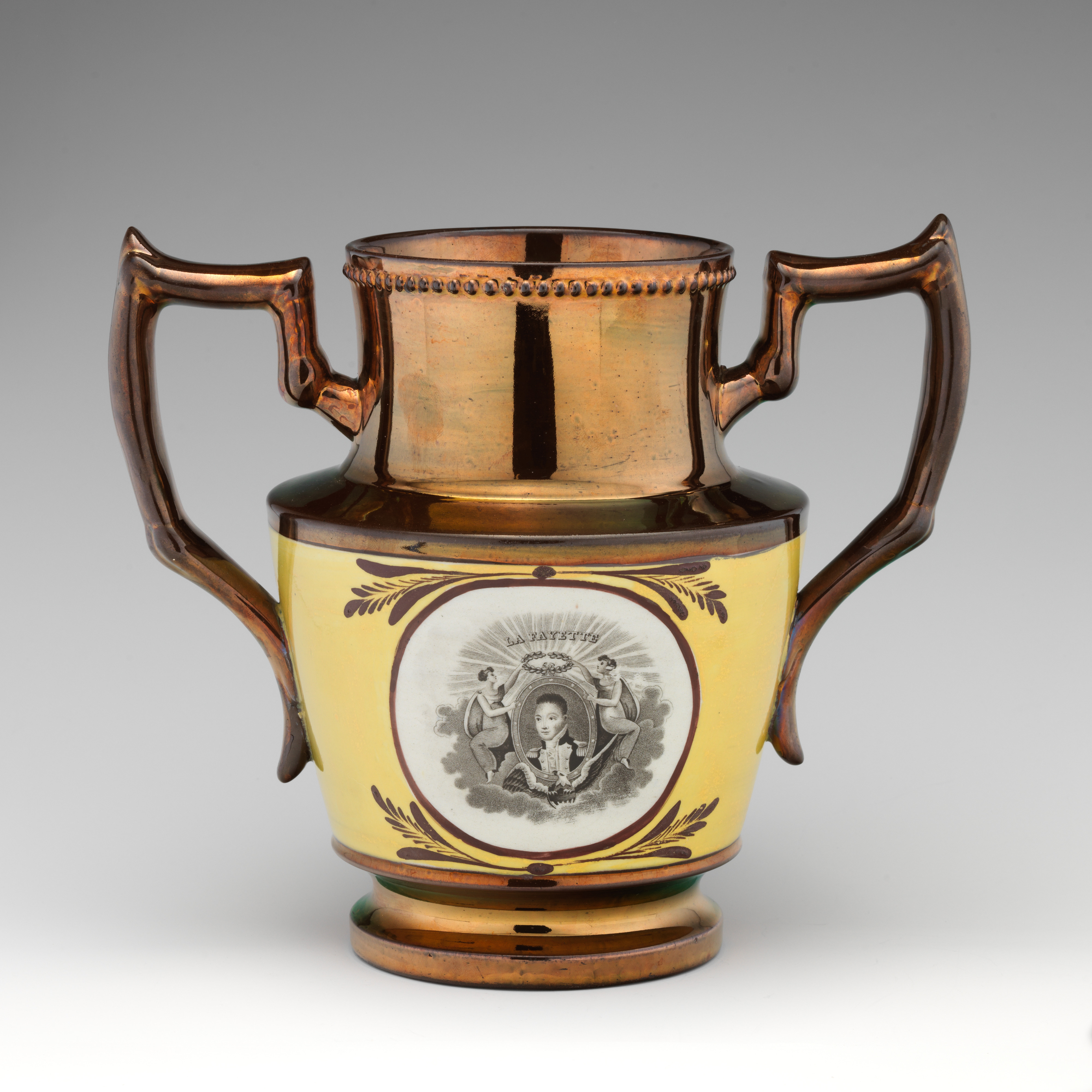
English urn for the American market, 19th century

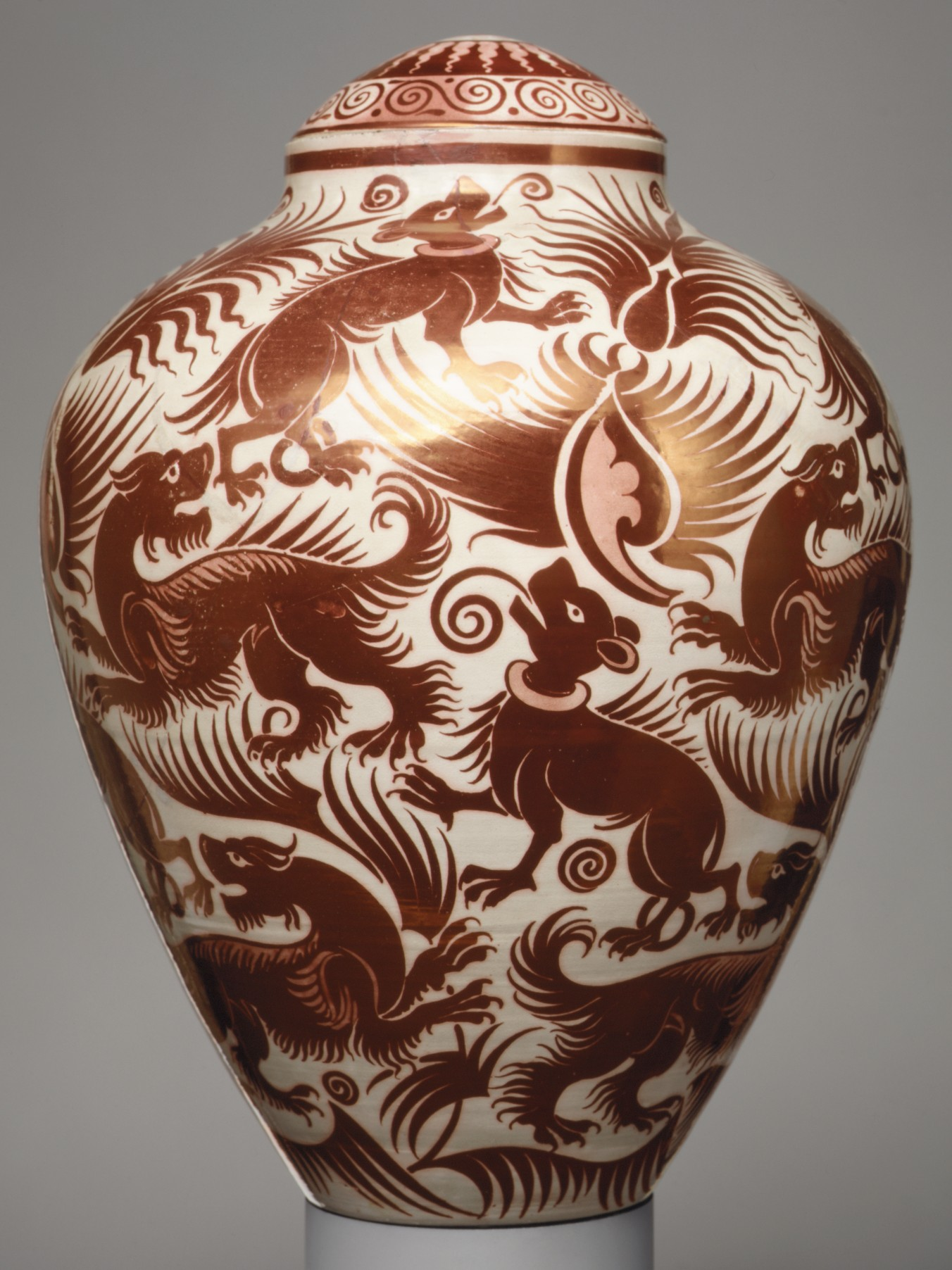
Vase by William de Morgan, 1888–98, English

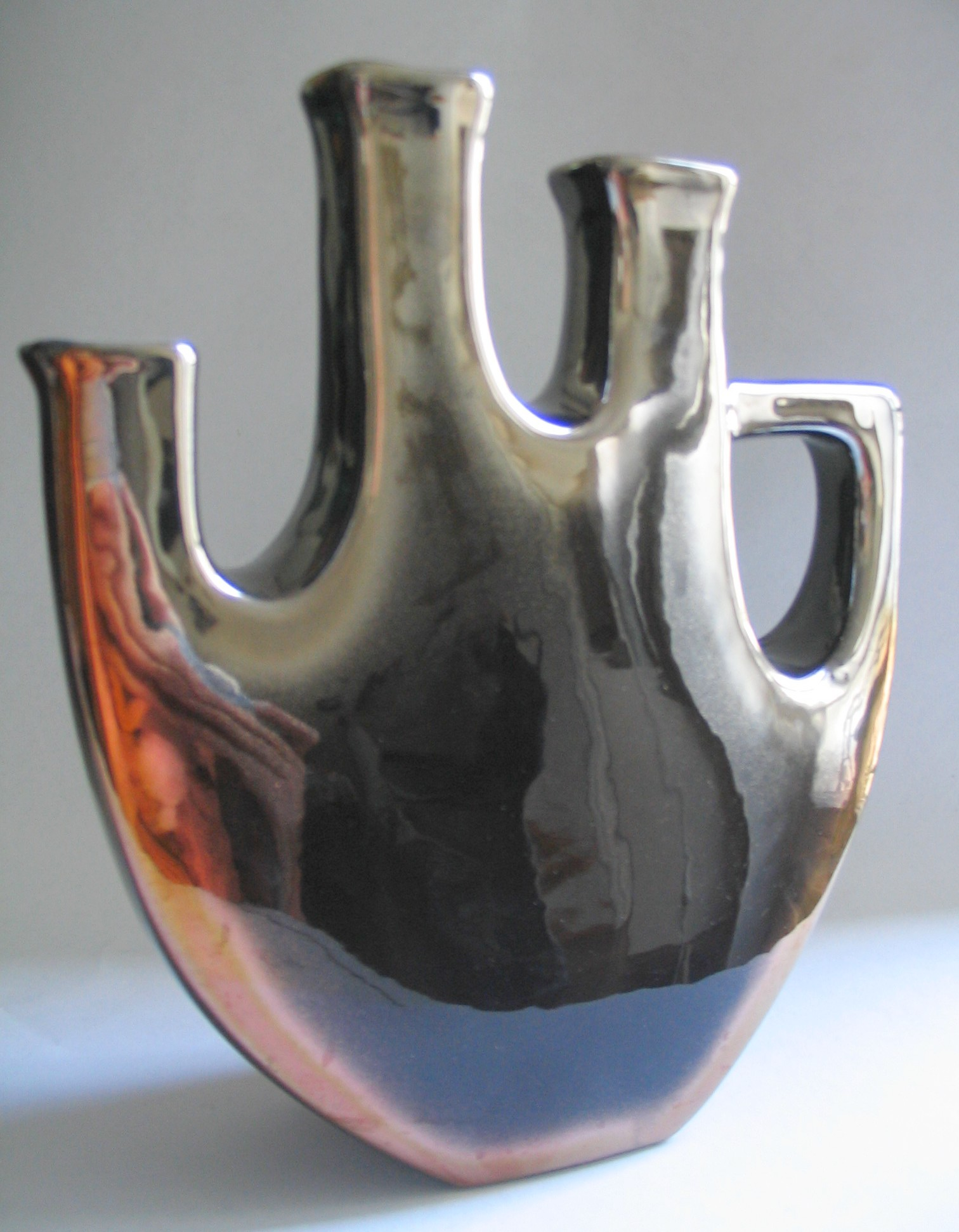
Belgian vase, 20th century

== See also ==
- Eosin
- List of pottery terms
