= Inflow =

Inflow may refer to:

- Inflow (hydrology), the water entering a body of water
- Inflow (meteorology), the influx of warmth and moisture from air into storm systems
- Capital inflows, in macroeconomics and international finance
- Infiltration/Inflow, in sanitary sewers

== See also ==
- Outflow (disambiguation)
