= Secondary flux =

Flux agent requiring to be combined with another flux to perform properly

A secondary flux is a ceramic flux (such as calcium, barium, magnesium or zinc oxide) which does not act as a good flux (i.e., lower the melting point of the mixture) alone, but is effective when used in combination with other fluxes. They also tend to act as "anti-fluxes" at lower temperatures, and may produce matt or opaque glazes under those conditions. For example, calcium oxide is generally used with sodium or potassium and by itself has little fluxing effect at pyrometric cone 6 but does act as a flux at cone 8.. When use calcium with lead it gives low melting temperature to glaz.

A primary flux is a metal ion such as sodium which acts as a flux at all temperatures.

== See also ==
- Ceramic flux
