= Flux (software company) =

- Company type: Private
- Industry: Enterprise Software, Finance
- Founded: 2000; 26 years ago
- Headquarters: Boulder
- Area served: Worldwide
- Website: flux.ly

Flux is a software company that develops and licenses software products targeted for workflow, job scheduling, and managed file transfer. Headquartered in Boulder, Flux also has offices in Houston and Memphis.

== Company ==
Flux was founded in 2000 by David Sims when it transitioned from a one-person consulting shop to a software company that sold an automatic job scheduler software component for the Java Platform, Enterprise Edition. The company has been self-funded since its inception.

Since then, the company's products have expanded into the following markets:

- Workflow
- Job scheduling
- Managed file transfer

== Partners ==
File Transfer Consulting has partnered with Flux to provide a resource for designing managed file transfer systems. Flux is one of the tools that File Transfer Consulting uses to help meet its clients' managed file transfer needs. File Transfer Consulting's staff has developed managed file transfer tools that are used by more than 1,200 enterprises worldwide.

== See also ==
- List of job scheduler software
