= Outflow =

Outflow may refer to:

- Capital outflow, the capital leaving a particular economy
- Bipolar outflow, in astronomy, two continuous flows of gas from the poles of a star
- Outflow (hydrology), the discharge of a lake or other reservoir system
- Outflow (meteorology), air that flows outwards from a thunderstorm
- Outflow boundary, in atmospheric science, separating thunderstorm-cooled air from the surrounding air
