= Ceramic flux =

Oxides added to lower the melting point of glass and ceramics

Fluxes are substances, usually oxides, used in glasses, glazes and ceramic bodies to lower the high melting point of the main glass forming constituents, usually silica and alumina. A ceramic flux functions by promoting partial or complete liquefaction. The most commonly used fluxing oxides in a ceramic glaze contain lead, sodium, potassium, lithium, calcium, magnesium, barium, zinc, strontium, and manganese. These are introduced to the raw glaze as compounds, for example lead as lead oxide. Boron is considered by many to be a glass former rather than a flux.

Some oxides, such as calcium oxide, flux significantly only at high temperature. Lead oxide is the traditional low temperature flux used for crystal glass, but it is now avoided because it is toxic even in small quantities. It is being replaced by other substances, especially boron and zinc oxides.

In clay bodies a flux creates a limited and controlled amount of glass, which works to cement crystalline phases together. Fluxes play a key role in the vitrification of clay bodies by lowering the overall melting point. The most common fluxes used in clay bodies are potassium oxide and sodium oxide which are found in feldspars. A predominant flux in glazes is calcium oxide which is usually obtained from limestone. The two most common feldspars in the ceramic industry are potash feldspar (orthoclase) and soda feldspar (albite).

== Common oxides ==
List of commonly used ceramic oxides:

- Al_{2}O_{3}
- B_{2}O_{3}
- BaO
- CaO
- CoO
- Cr_{2}O_{3}
- Cu_{2}O
- CuO
- Fe_{2}O_{3}
- FeO
- H_{2}O
- K_{2}O
- Li_{2}O
- MgO
- MnO
- MnO_{2}
- Na_{2}O
- NiO
- P_{2}O_{5}
- PbO
- SiO_{2}
- SnO_{2}
- SO_{3}
- SrO
- TiO_{2}
- V_{2}O_{5}
- ZnO
- ZrO
- ZrO_{2}

== See also ==
- Flux (metallurgy)
- Loss on ignition

== See also ==
- Secondary flux
