= Islamopolitan =

Islamopolitan is a term that combine the words “Islam” and “Cosmopolitan”. It sets out to examine multiculturalism and diversity through a traveling exhibition which started from its origin in the UAE then went to Turkey and Milan. An ironic approach that encourages the local and the global in their philosophies and at the same time explores the tensions between the two worlds.

== Origin ==
The term “Islamopolitan” was coined in 2014 by the Italian artist Giuseppe Moscatello and the Emirati designer Khalid Shafar. They co-curated an art exhibition at Maraya Art Centre with the same name to highlight the universal topic and dialogue between Islam and design. The structure of work and daily life, religion, architecture, rituals and decoration have been interpreted in relation to the present day. Designers of twelve different nationalities present works that take a contemporary look at the rituals of an ancient culture, through the media of furniture, jewellery, photography, video, art, installations, objects, upholstery, carpets, fashion, ceramics and sound. The individual pieces each highlight the Islamic spirit but leave the issue of interpretation up to the viewer.

== See also ==
- Islamic calligraphy
- Islamic architecture
- Islamic Golden Age
- Islamic pottery
- Islamic geometric patterns
