= Lajvardina =

Type of Iranian ceramics

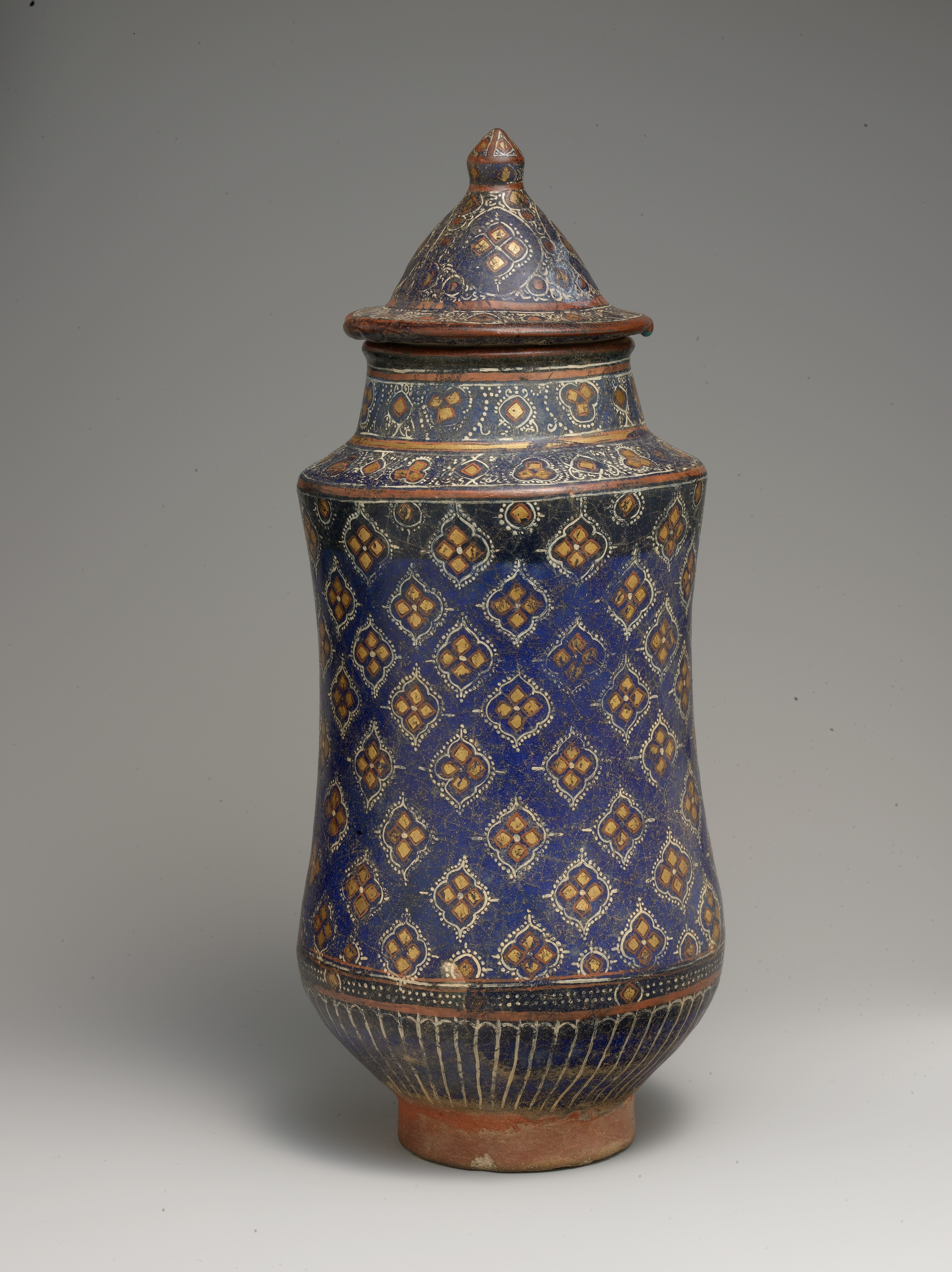
Albarelle, Iran, second half of the 13th century – 14th century, Metropolitan Museum of Art

Lajvardina-type ceramics (Persian: سفال لاجوردینه) were developed in the 13th century following the Mongol conquest of Persia and Mesopotamia. It was produced throughout the Ilkhanate reign. It is characterized by its deep blue color and often features geometric patterns or foliage inlaid with gold leaf. The style was created using overglaze enamel. An initial layer of dark blue glaze, produced from cobalt, was applied, followed by another layer, often gold, on which the details were painted. It was primarily produced in Kashan, a center for ceramic production and lusterware in the 12th and early 13th centuries. The style was continuously used for tiles and ornamental objects from the 1260s C.E. until the mid-14th century, when production dropped significantly, coinciding with the fall of the Ilkhanate in 1335.

== Etymology ==
The term collectors term "lajvardina" (Persian: لاجوردینه) references the Persian name of lapis lazuli, a precious blue mineral between azure and ultramarine. The term lajvardina is a misnomer, as these ceramics are characterized by their use of cobalt blue, which visually imitates lapis lazuli.

== History ==
In the 1180s, Kashan produced some of the finest ceramics made in medieval Islam. Kashan Potters had perfected the lustre technique, invented overglaze enameling, and explored breakthroughs in underglaze painting. The production of these lustre wares grew tremendously. The wares of Kashan, in particular, were traded throughout Central Asia, Iran, Syria, and Egypt. Kashan widely produced these wares until the 13th century, when the devastation of the Mongols' wrath caused production to freeze for almost 40 years.

The Mongol armies brought on an onslaught of unparalleled violence and destruction, bringing central Asia to a standstill. We can see these effects when examining the ceramic artifacts in collections.

Kashan lustreware is regularly dated until the early A.D. 1220s; coinciding with the Mongolian invasion. Production stops during this time. Then it starts up again in A.D. 1260s. At this point, the Mongols had overthrown the last Abbasid caliph, taken Baghdad, and installed themselves as the Ilkhanid rulers of Iran.

Once the Mongol Ilkhanid established its rule, ceramics production began again. Although all the pre-Mongol types of ceramics continued to be made, the effect on decoration styles in Iran was marked. In lustreware, tiles appear to have become the predominant output. Ilkhanid overglaze enamels are known as Lajvardina in recognition of the distinct cobalt blue glaze it sports. These lajvardina pieces are most often adorned with sprawling foliage motifs.

Dated pieces tell us that Mongolian lajvardina was produced during the second half of the 13th century and into the 14th century during the Ilkhanid dynasty. The dramatic decline in numbers and production quality of lustre pieces dated in the 15th century indicates reduction of this method. The correlation between the method's decline and the end of the Ilkhanid rule in A.D. 1335 is not directly causal.

== Production ==
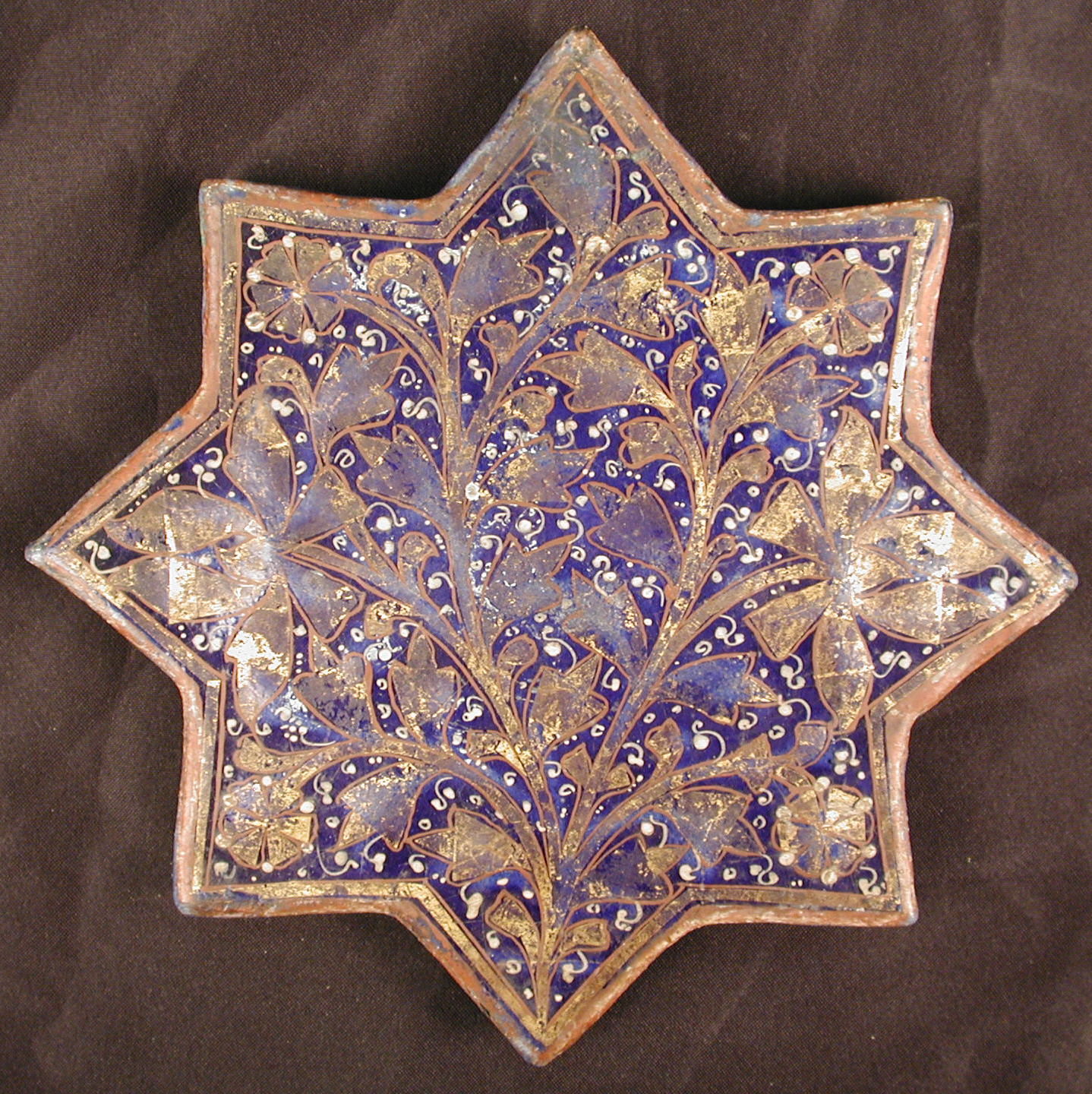
Star-shaped tile, second half of the 13th – 14th century, Metropolitan Museum of Art

=== Fritware ===
Lajvardina ceramics were usually made from a material known as fritware or stone paste. This is made by combining clay with crushed quartz fragments, which leads to a whiter, although depending on the size of the quartz, rougher and less plastic (easy to shape) medium. Depending on the firing process, the clay and quartz fuse together with the glaze to create tough objects.

=== In the treatise of Abu'l Qasim al-Kashani ===
Abu'l Qasim al-Kashani's descended from a line of potters

Most knowledge about the production of Lajvardina wares derives from Abu'l Qasim al-Kashani well-known treatise on ceramics from 1301. Qasim descended from a line of potters and gave an account of creating pottering both in his past and present, which coincided with the high point of lajvardina ware production.

Scholars rely on Qasim to understand the production of fritware, glazes, and firing techniques. Through Qasim, it is known to mix the dark blue underglaze characteristic of lajvardina ware. One had to "Add ten dirhams of Sulaimani lajvard" (meaning cobalt) to the crushed glass and water glaze. To mix the lajvardina turquoise glaze, "they add for every man of ground tin ten dirhams of ground roasted cooper." Experts have long interpreted Qasim's use of lajvard or sulaimani in the treatise to refer to cobalt and that Qasam uses lajvard to reference the look of lapis lazuli stone rather than it being used as part of the glaze.

=== Use of lapis lazuli ===
While specialists generally agree that cobalt is the material used to obtain the blue color of the glaze. Philippe Colomban has in the analysis of one an Iranian jug from the thirteenth century, shown the presence of lapis lazuli being used in a glaze.

Production location

Kashan is generally thought to be the center of production of this type of ceramic.

== Description ==
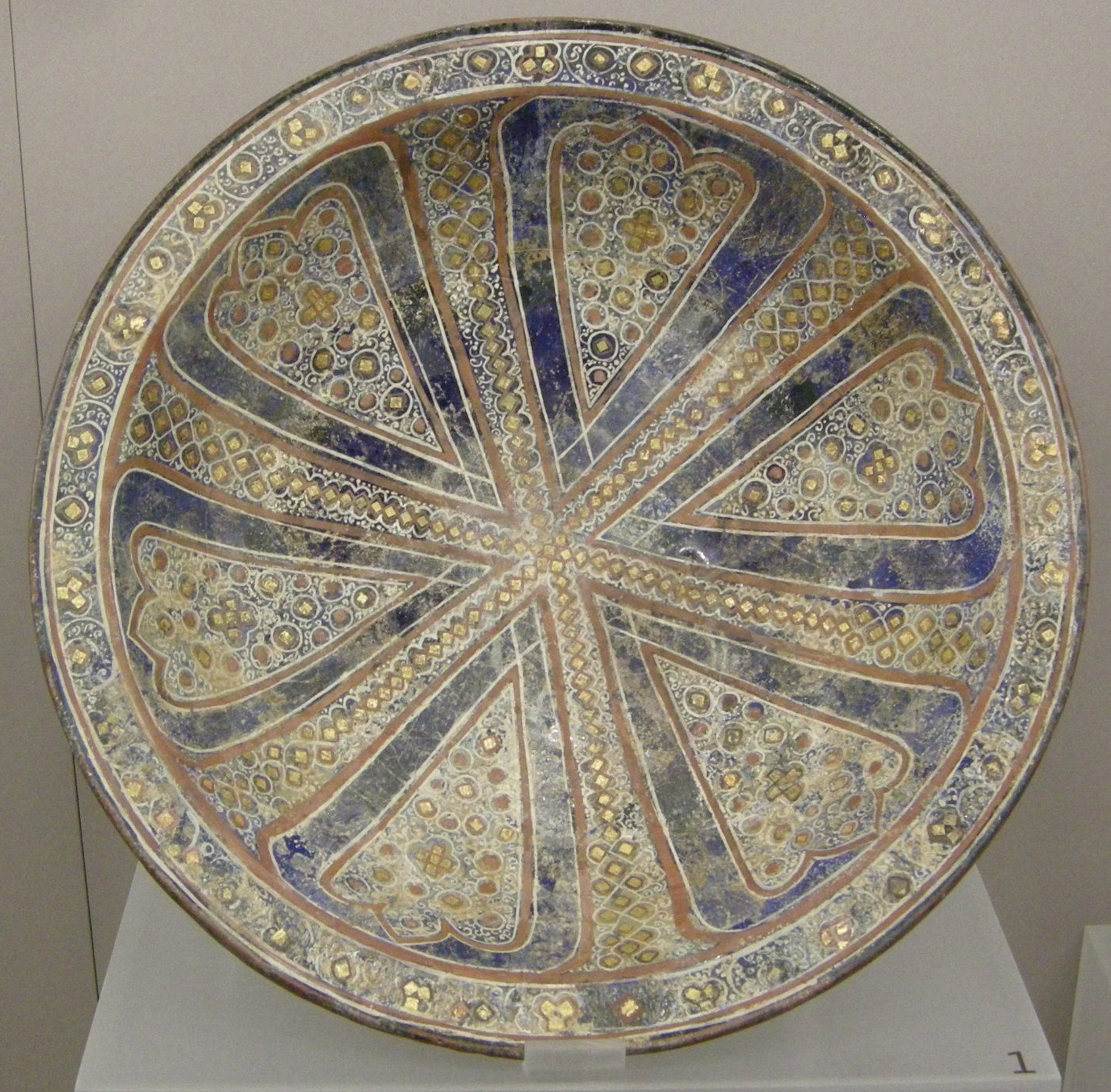
Lajvardina type bowl with radial composition, 13th – 14th century,Museum of Oriental Art in Turin

=== Colors ===
The Mongol conquest of Iran saw the disappearance of the illustrated scenes of

Mina'i (also known as haft-rang) ceramics to give way to denser and less figural compositions.

Lajvardina wares are usually characterized by a dark blue or turquoise underglaze, however there are also examples of white or more green tinted ceramics. The second layer of glaze, which adds the abstracted decoration, is often white, red and black, with inlaid pieces of cut gold leaf.

=== Decoration ===
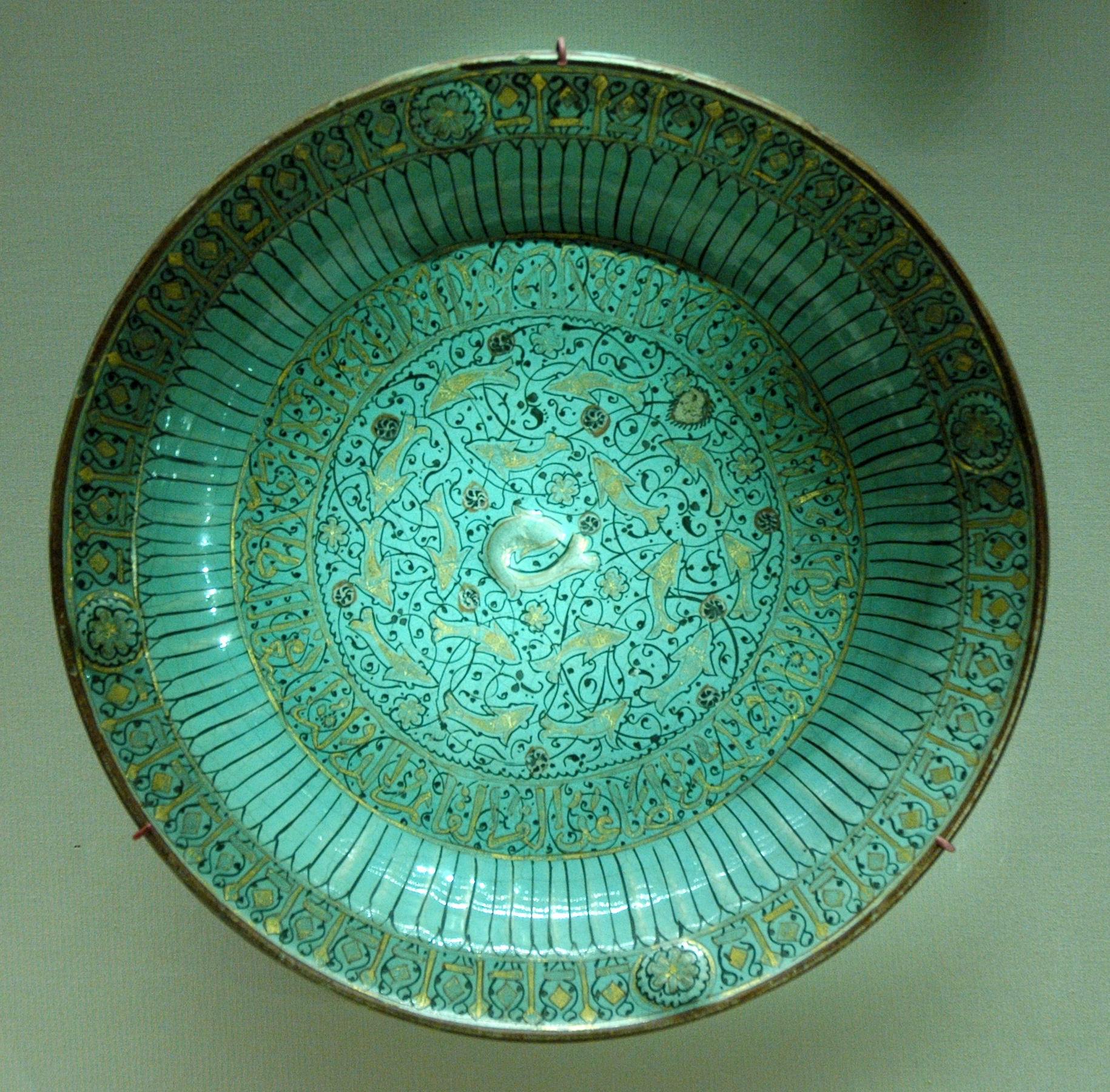
Round dish of fish, late 13th – early 14th century, Louvre Museum

The decoration of Lajvardina ceramics is almost exclusively non-figurative. Designs became more geometric and patterned following the mongule invasion. The influence of the Mongols also caused some of the Chinese motifs that are commonly seen in Lajvardina ceramics, for example phoenixes and scrollwork, as well as plants like lotuses, chrysanthemums and peonies. It is thought that these influences came not directly from Chinese made ceramics but from the designs seen on fabric.

According to Soustiel, about a third of the lajvardina type shaped pieces are radial type compositions.

== Use in Architecture ==
Most examples of Lajvardina vessels were made for decorative use. There are many examples of Lajvardina tiles, and these were often used to tile the outsides of buildings. Tiles are seen as the better preserved examples of the design style.

Lajvardina-type ceramics were used around 1334 for the coverings of the mausoleum of Qutham ibn Abbas in the necropolis of Shah-i-Zinda, near Samarkand.

== Gallery ==
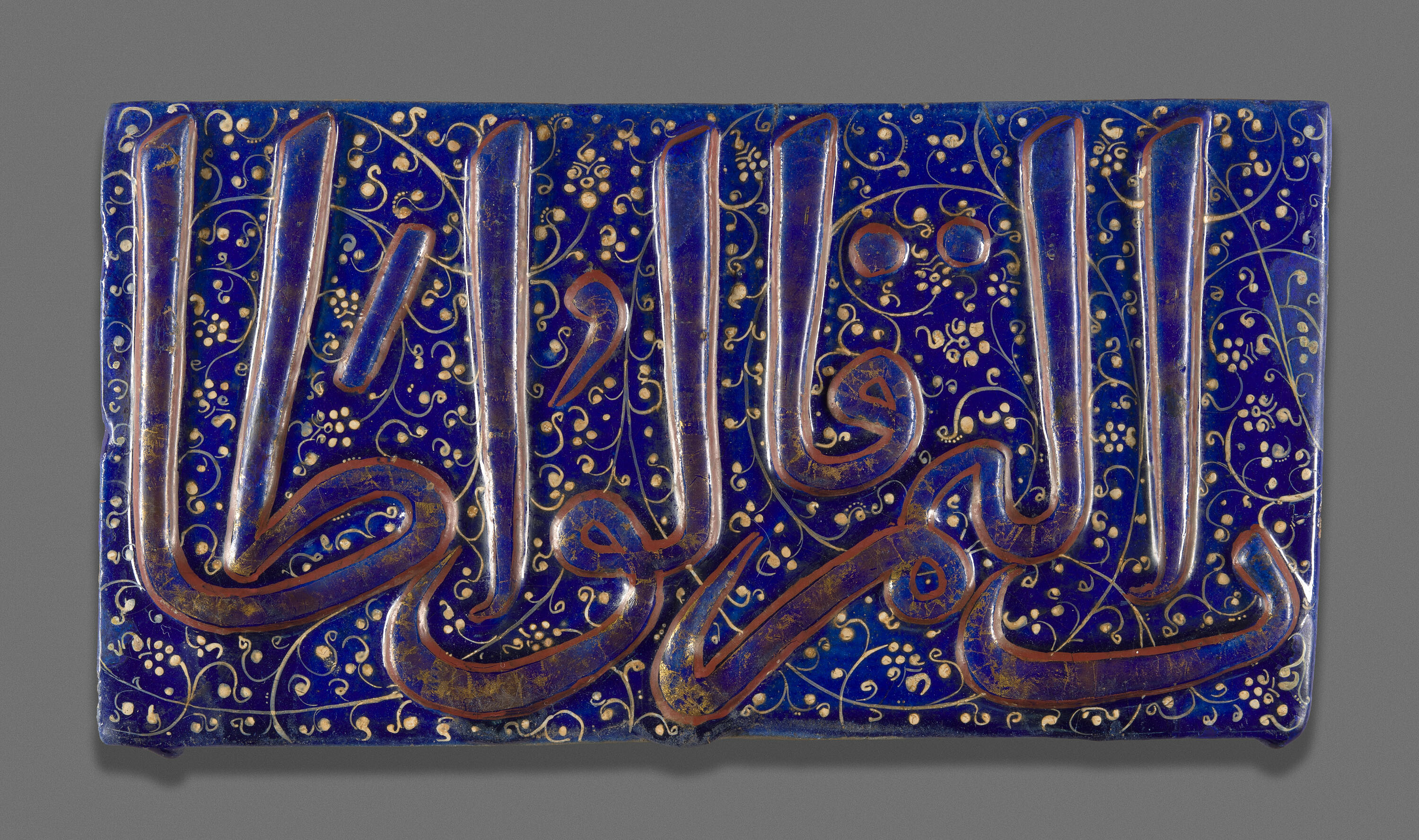
Tile, Iran 1301–1353. Fritware, molded and decorated with leaf gilding and red over a blue glaze. Art Institute of Chicago

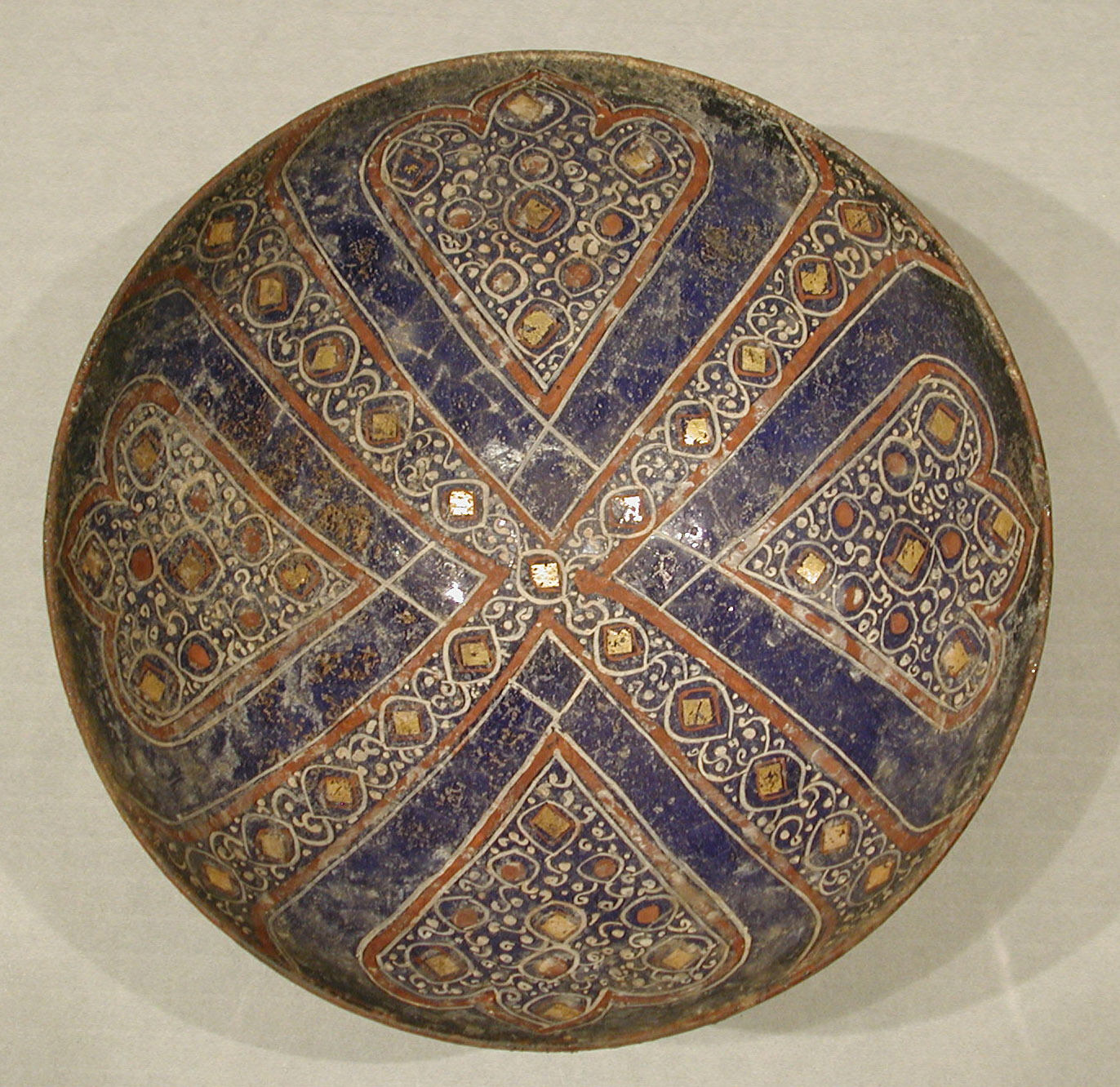
Bowl, late 13th–early 14th century, Iran. Stonepaste; overglaze painted and gilded. Metropolitan Museum of Art

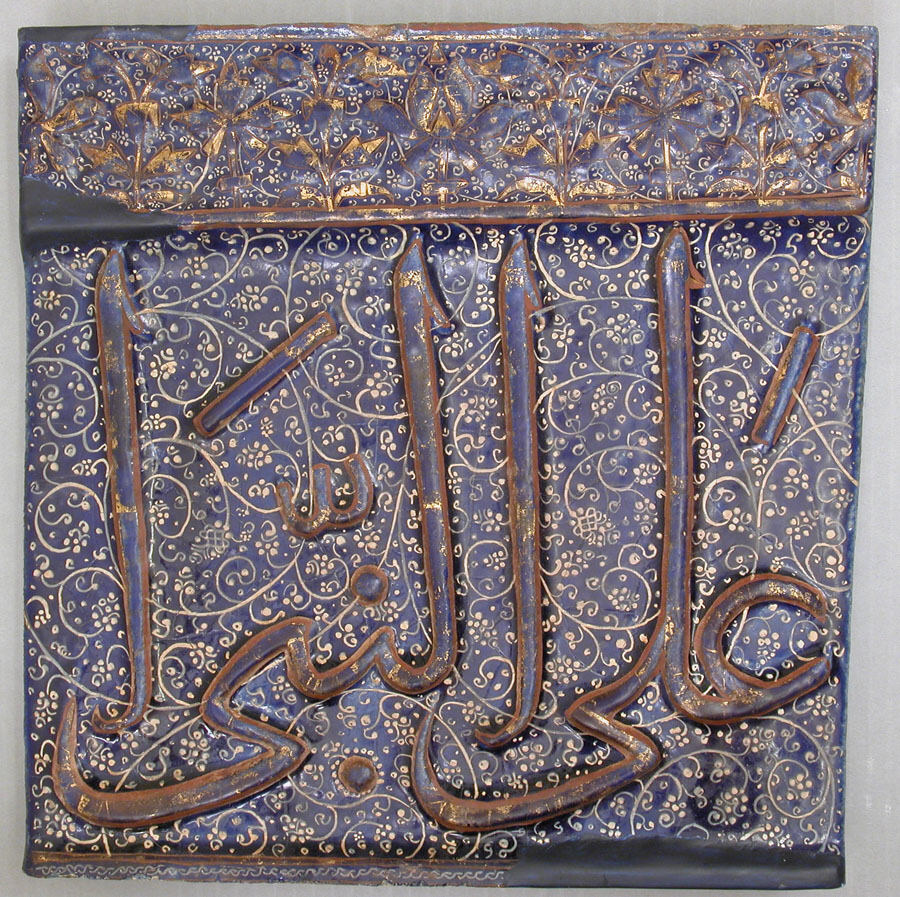
Tile from an Inscriptional Frieze, early 14th century, Iran, Kashan. Stonepaste; modeled, overglaze painted, and gilded. Metropolitan Museum of Art

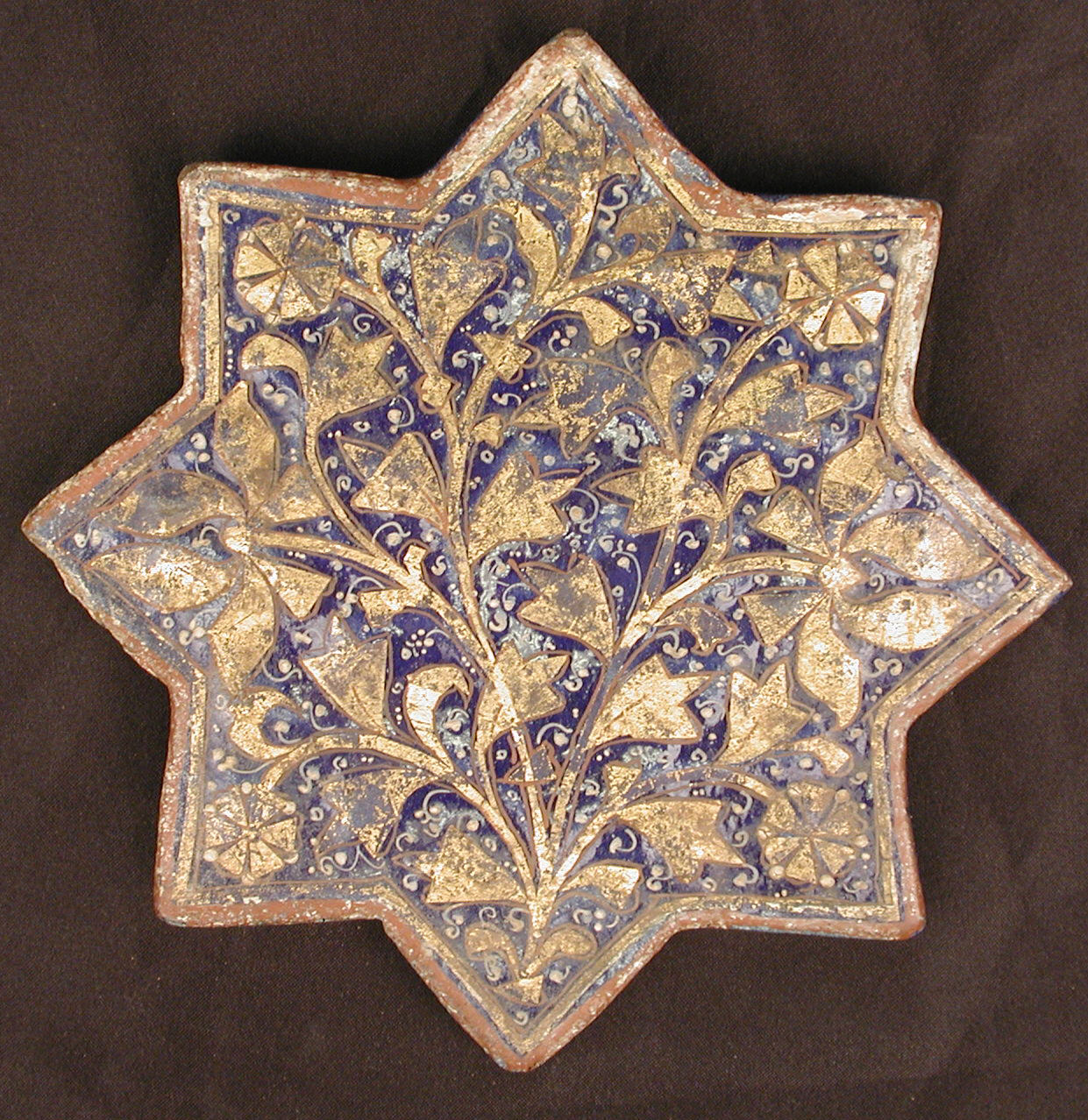
Three Tiles with 'Lajvardina' Glaze, second half 13th–14th century, Iran. Stonepaste; molded, overglaze painted, and gilded. Metropolitan Museum of Art

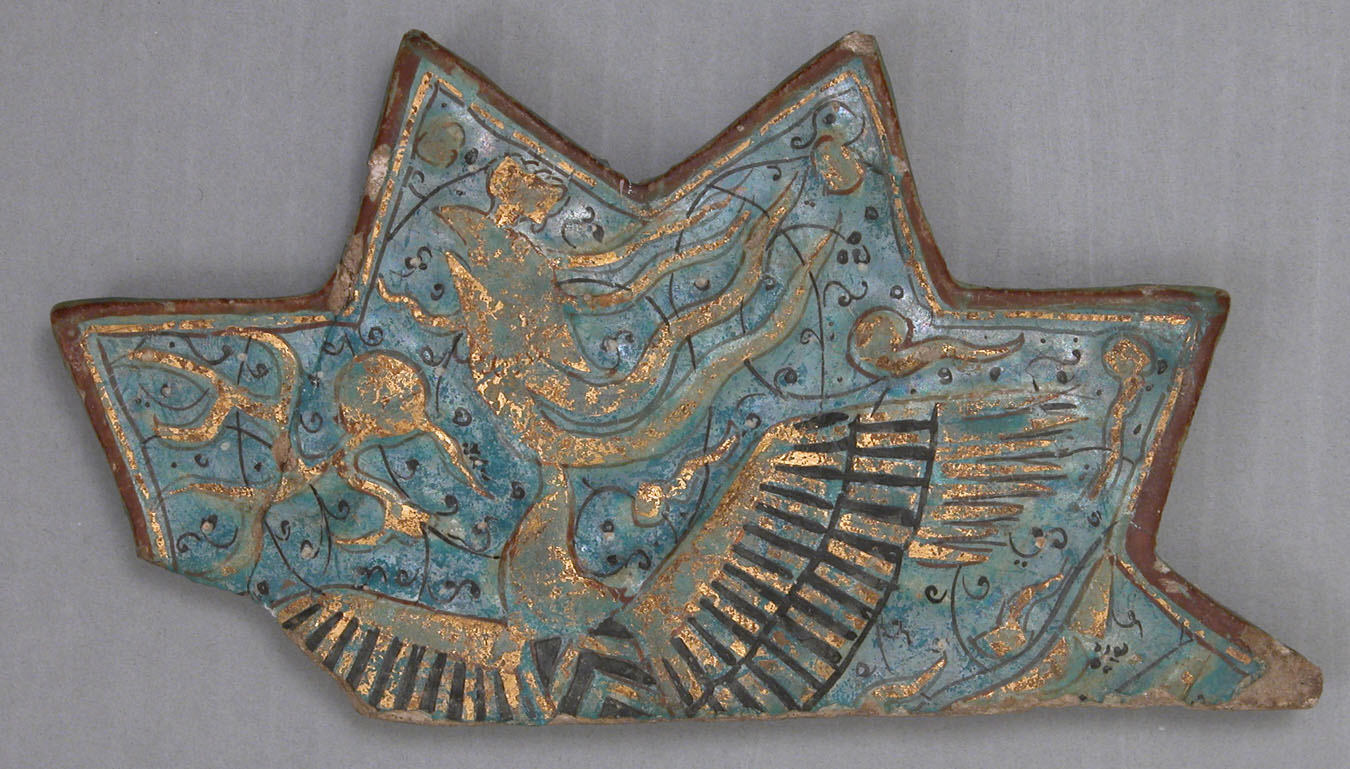
Star-Shaped Tile Fragment, second half 13th century, Iran. Stonepaste; molded, overglaze painted, and leaf gilded. Metropolitan Museum of Art

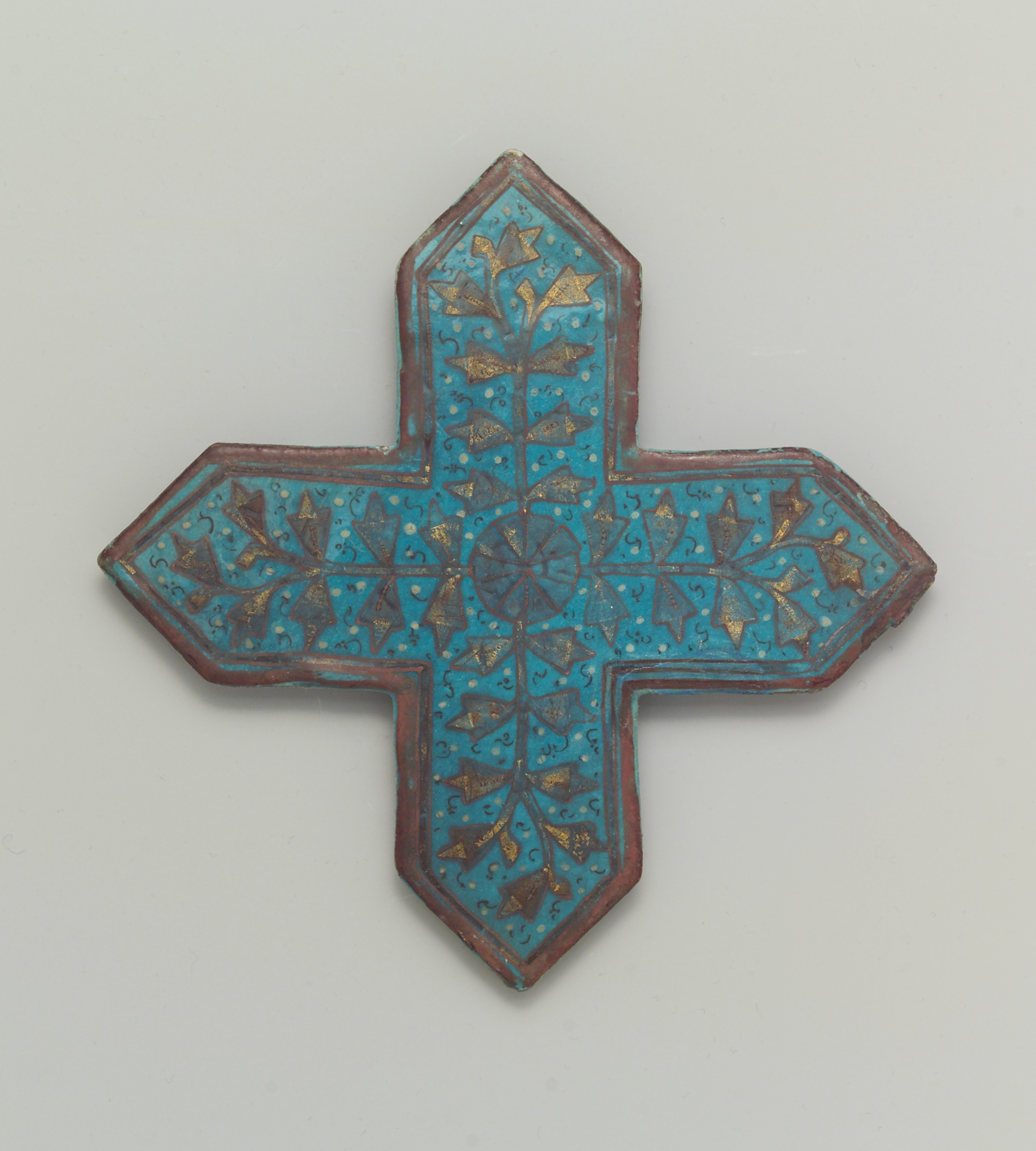
Cross-Shaped Tile, second half 13th–early 14th century, Iran. Stonepaste; overglaze painted and leaf gilded. Metropolitan Museum of Art

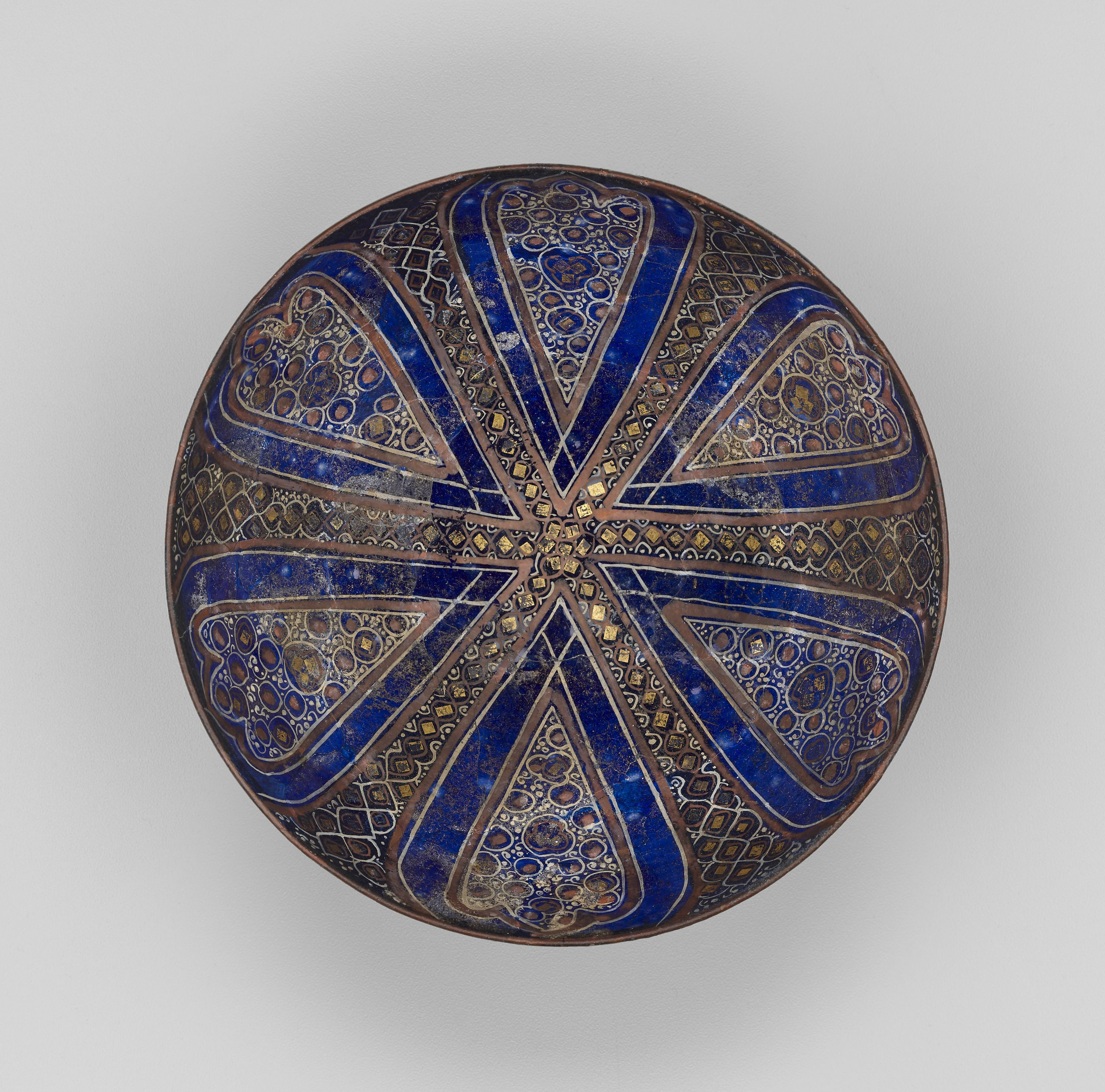
Bowl with radiating panels. Late 13th–early 14th century. Stonepaste with pigment and gilding over glaze. Yale University Art Gallery

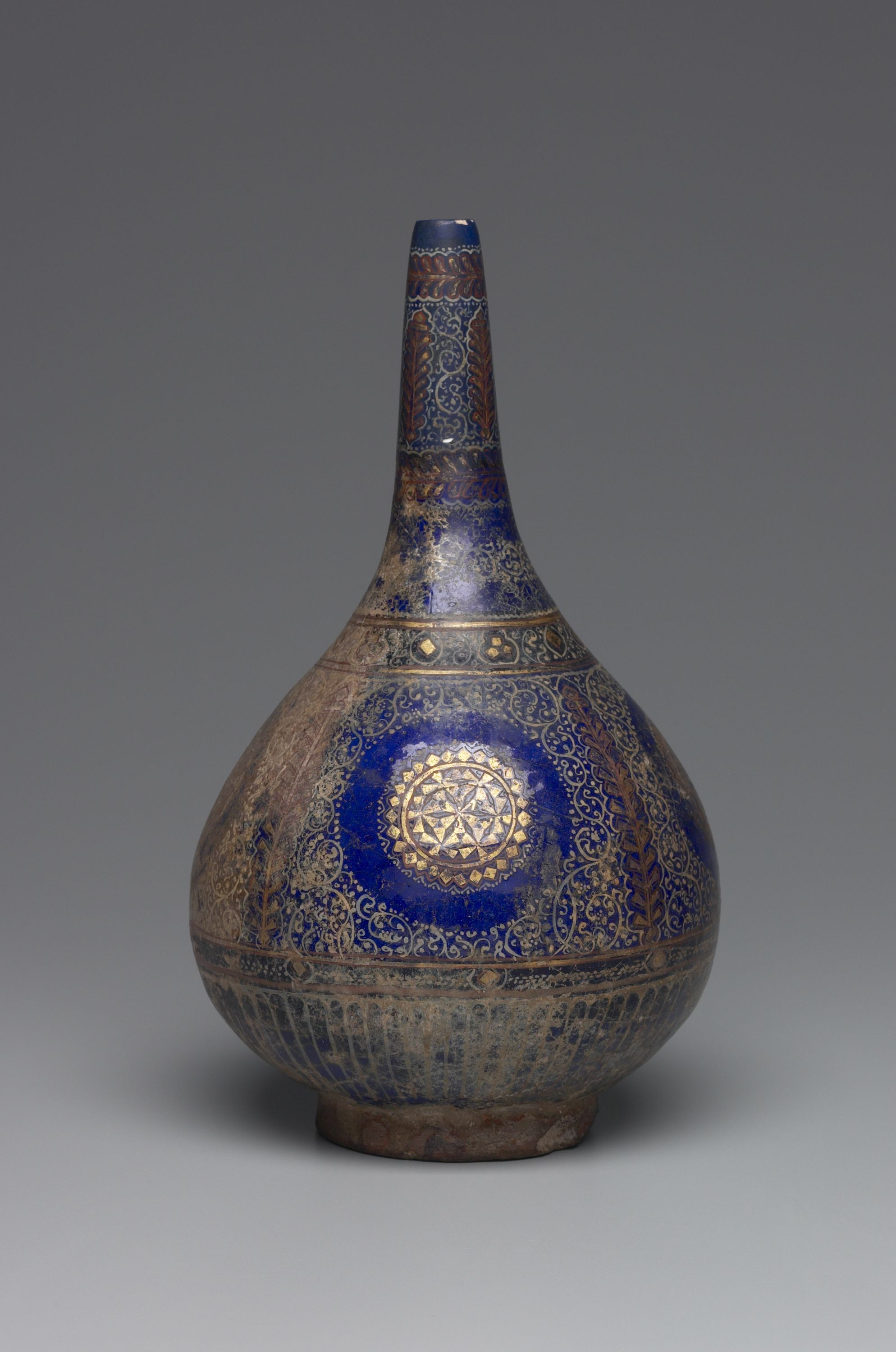
Bottle ca. 1300. Stonepaste with pigment and gilding over glaze. Yale University Art Gallery

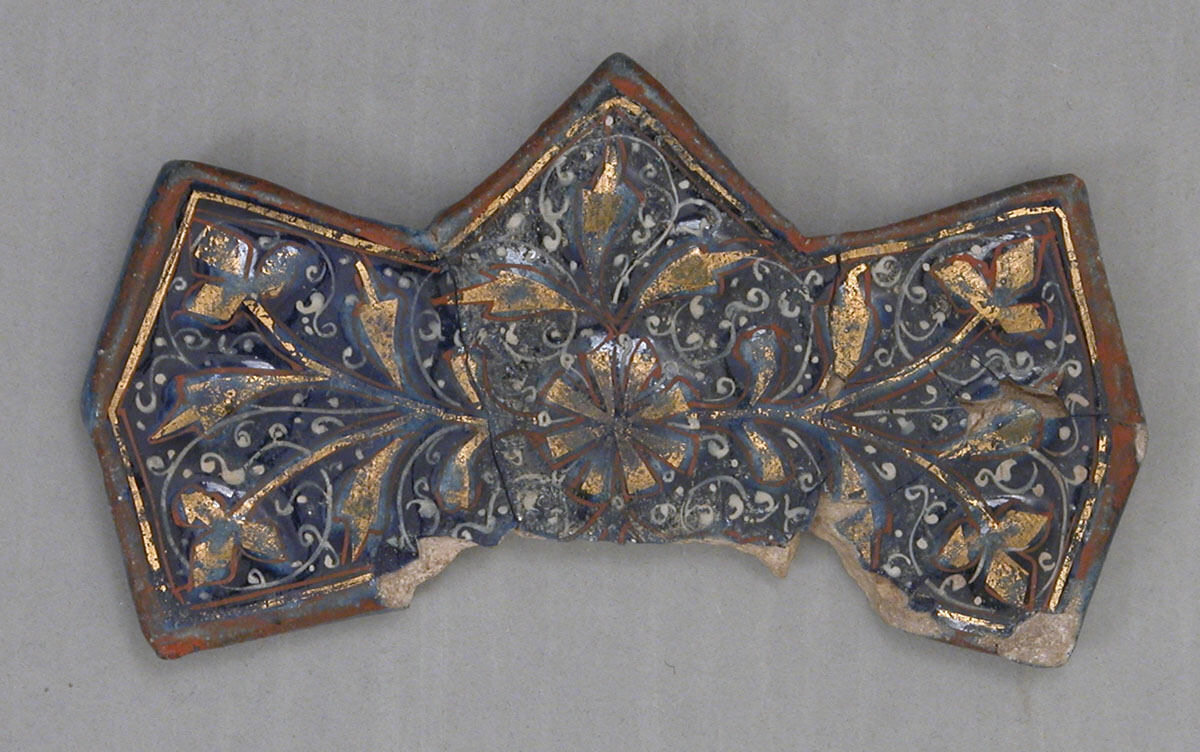
Tile Fragment, second half 13th century, Iran. Composite body; molded, overglaze painted and gilded. Metropolitan Museum of Art

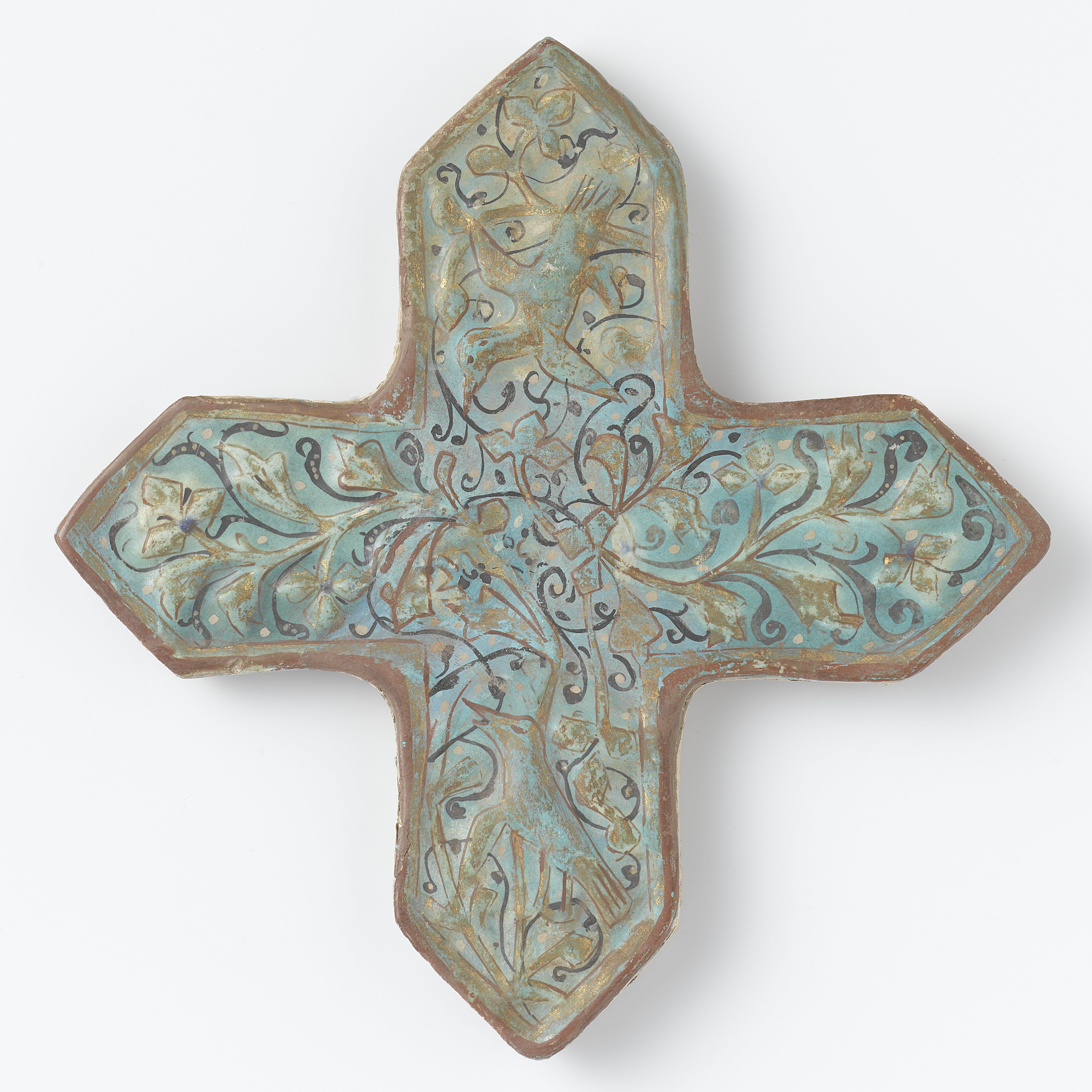
Tile in the shape of a cross with scrolls and birds c. 1250 – c. 1299. The Rijksmuseum

== See also ==
- Islamic pottery
- Sultanabad ware
