= Dish with epigraphic decoration =

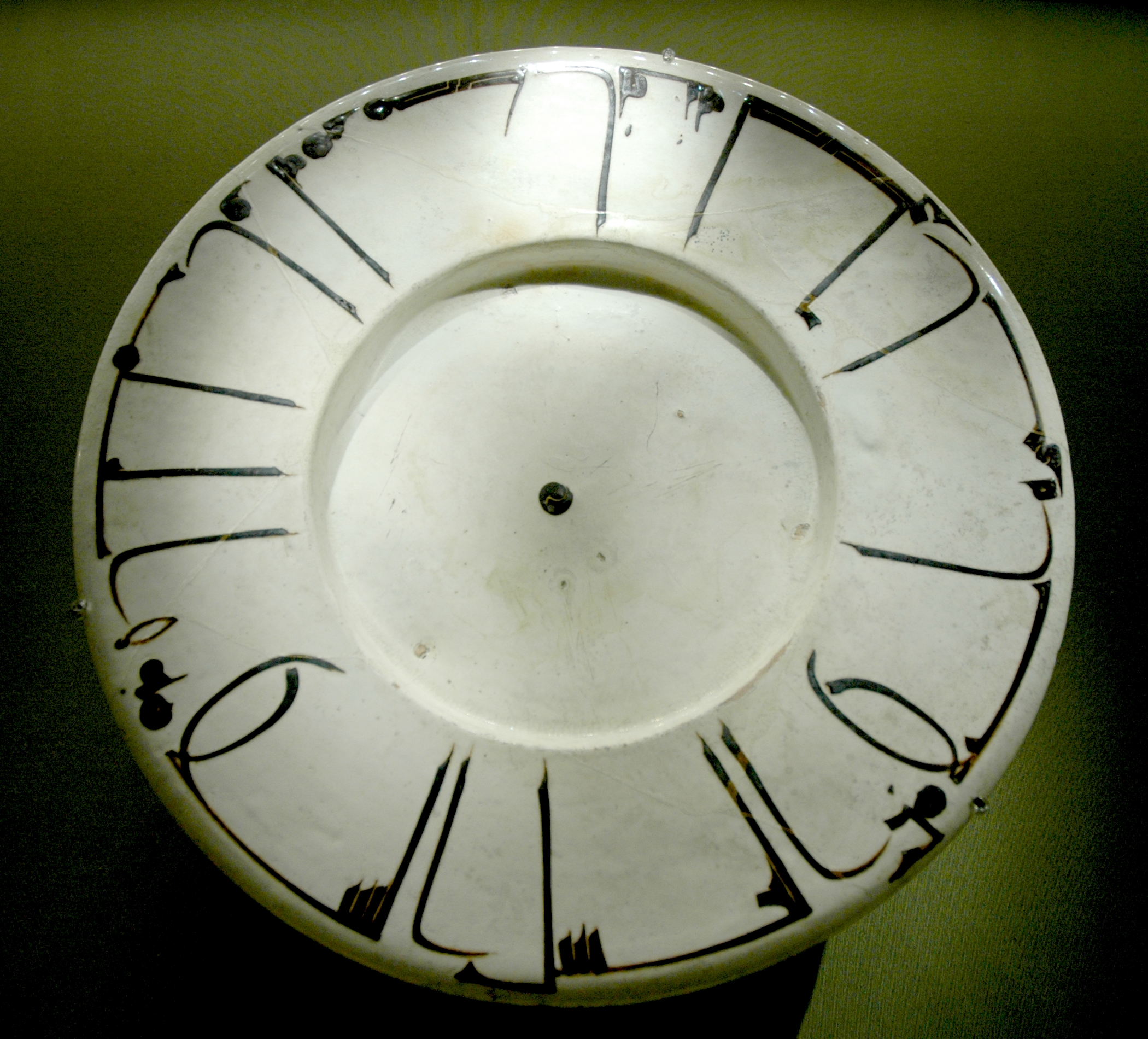
The Dish with epigraphic decoration, Iran

A dish with epigraphic decoration is an Islamic ceramic characteristic of the art developed in eastern Iran and Transoxiana around the 10th century, mainly during the Samanid dynasty (819-1005). The dish was presented to the Louvre Museum, by Alphonse Kann in 1935.

== Historical ==
The Dish with epigraphic decoration was made at the end of the 10th century, in eastern Iran or in Transoxiana. The production centers usually cited to house this type of ceramics are Nishapur and Samarkand. The dish is mentioned in a list drawn up by the collector A. Vassilieff from Kyiv who acquired it from a person who carried out excavations in Samarkand, in a private capacity. It is now kept at the Department of Islamic Arts of the Louvre Museum (inventory number AA 96). It was donated by Alphonse Kann in 1935.
