= Islamic pottery =

Pottery of Islamic lands

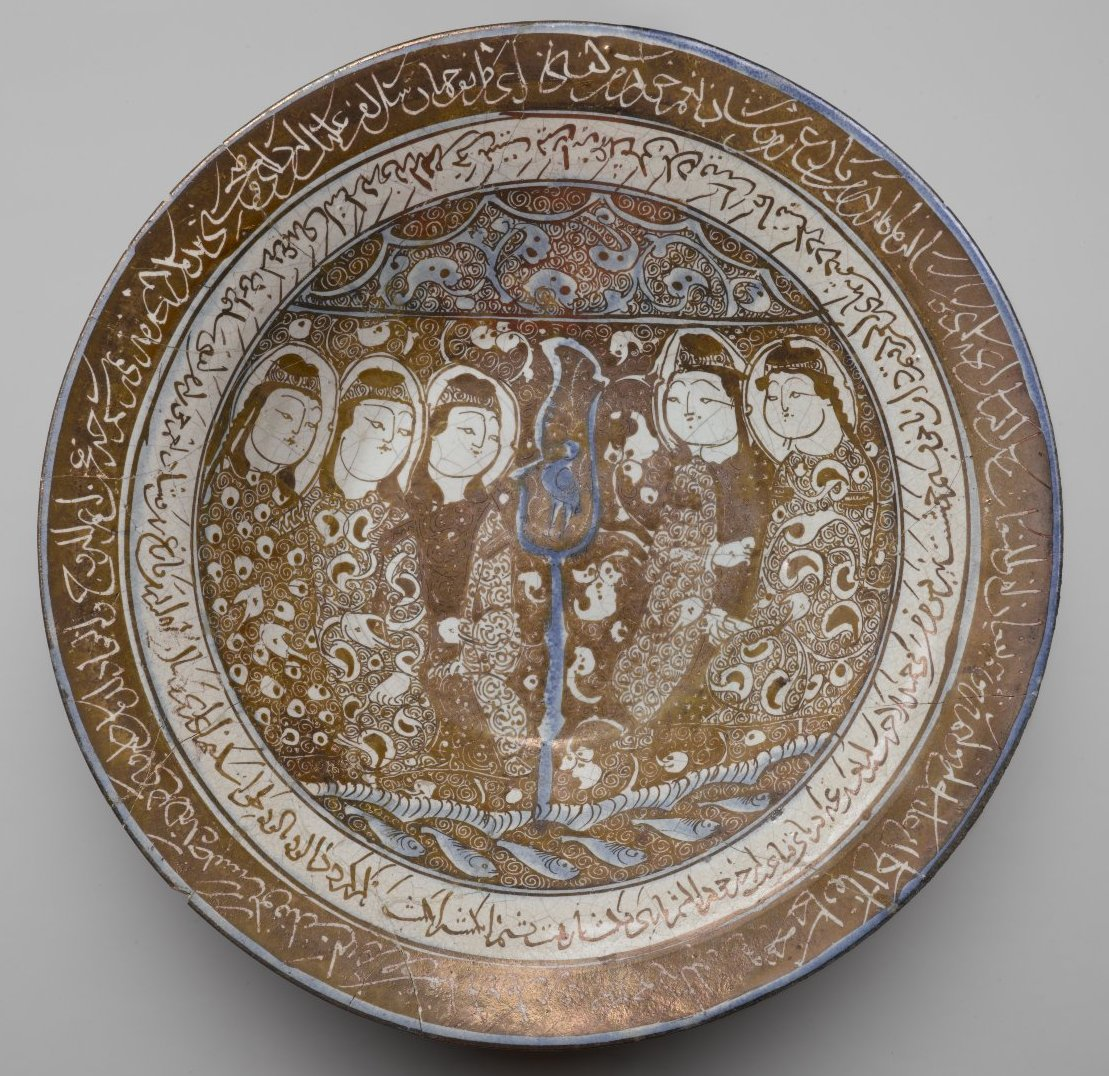
Bowl of Reflections, early 13th century Iran. Brooklyn Museum.

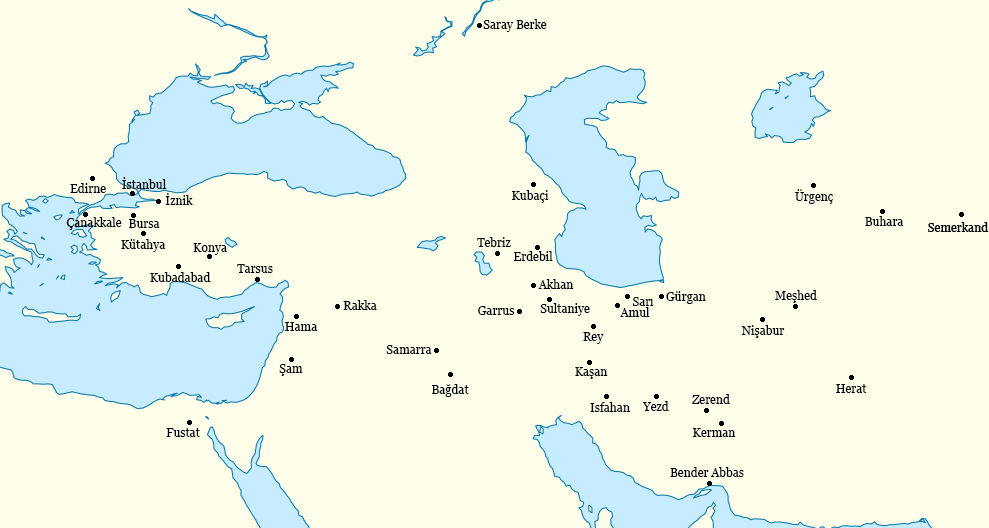
Chief places named in connection with Islamic pottery.

Islamic pottery occupied a geographical position between Chinese ceramics, and the pottery of the Byzantine Empire and Europe. For most of the period, it made great aesthetic achievements and influence as well, influencing Byzantium and Europe. The use of drinking and eating vessels in gold and silver, the ideal in ancient Rome and Persia as well as medieval Christian societies, is prohibited by the Hadiths, with the result that pottery and glass were used for tableware by Muslim elites, as pottery (but less often glass) also was in China but was much rarer in Europe and Byzantium. In the same way, Islamic restrictions greatly discouraged figurative wall painting, encouraging the architectural use of schemes of decorative and often geometrically patterned titles, which are the most distinctive and original speciality of Islamic ceramics.

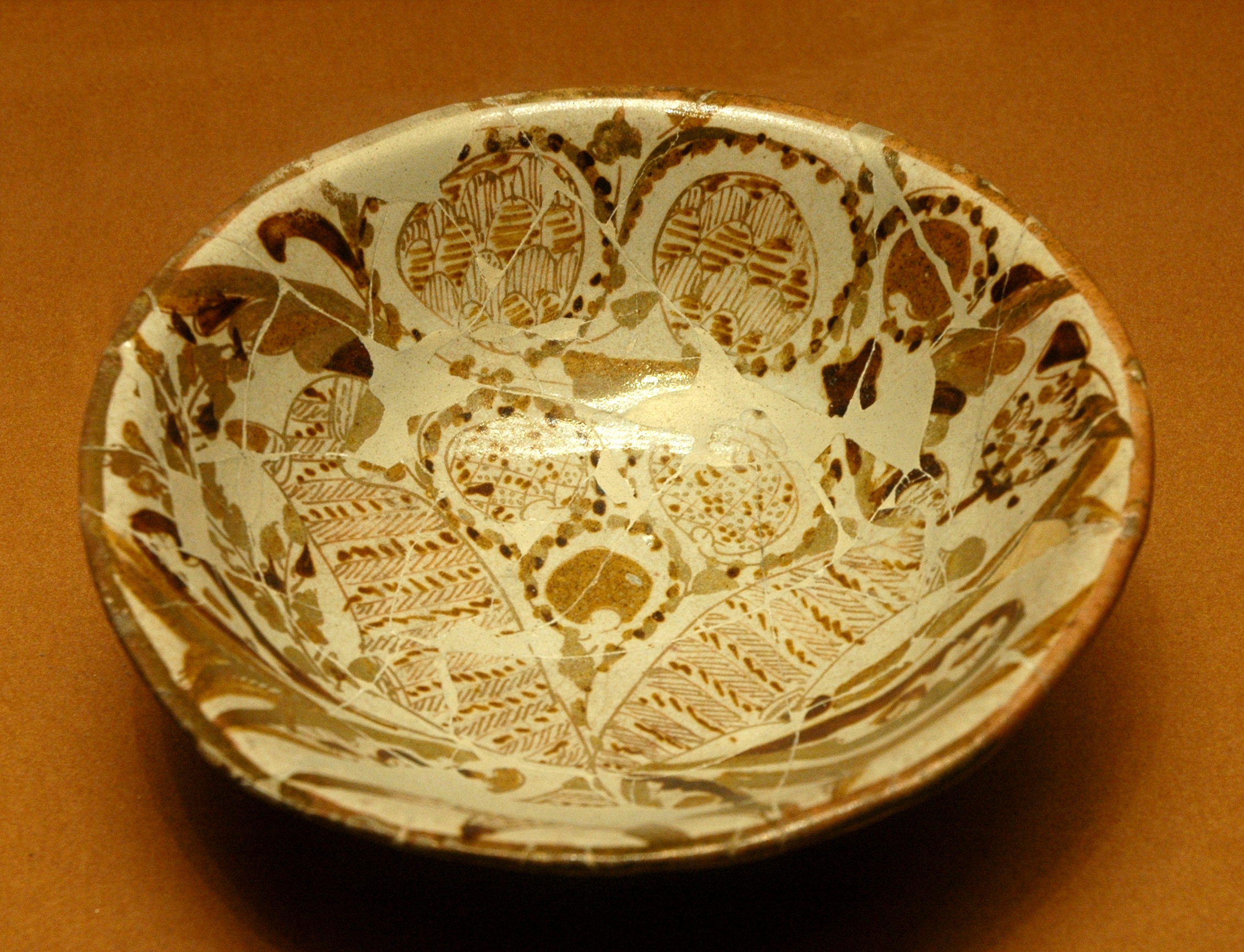
Cup with stylized bouquet, 9th century, Iraq. Clay pottery, polychrome luster decoration on opacified glaze. Paris, Louvre Museum, OA 7479.

The era of Islamic pottery started around 622. From 633, Muslim armies moved rapidly towards Persia, Byzantium, Mesopotamia, Anatolia, Egypt and later al-Andalus. The early history of Islamic pottery remains somewhat obscure and speculative as little evidence has survived. Apart from tiles that escaped destruction due to their use in architectural decoration of buildings and mosques, much early medieval pottery vanished.

The Muslim world inherited significant pottery industries in Mesopotamia, Persia, Egypt, North Africa (African Red Slip) and later other regions. Indeed, the origin of glazed pottery has been traced to Egypt where it was first introduced during the fourth millennium BCE. However, most of these traditions made heavy use of figurative decoration, which was greatly reduced, though not entirely removed, under Islam. Instead Islamic pottery developed geometric and plant-based decoration to a very high level and made more use of decorative schemes made up of many tiles than any previous culture.

== Early Medieval (622–1200) ==
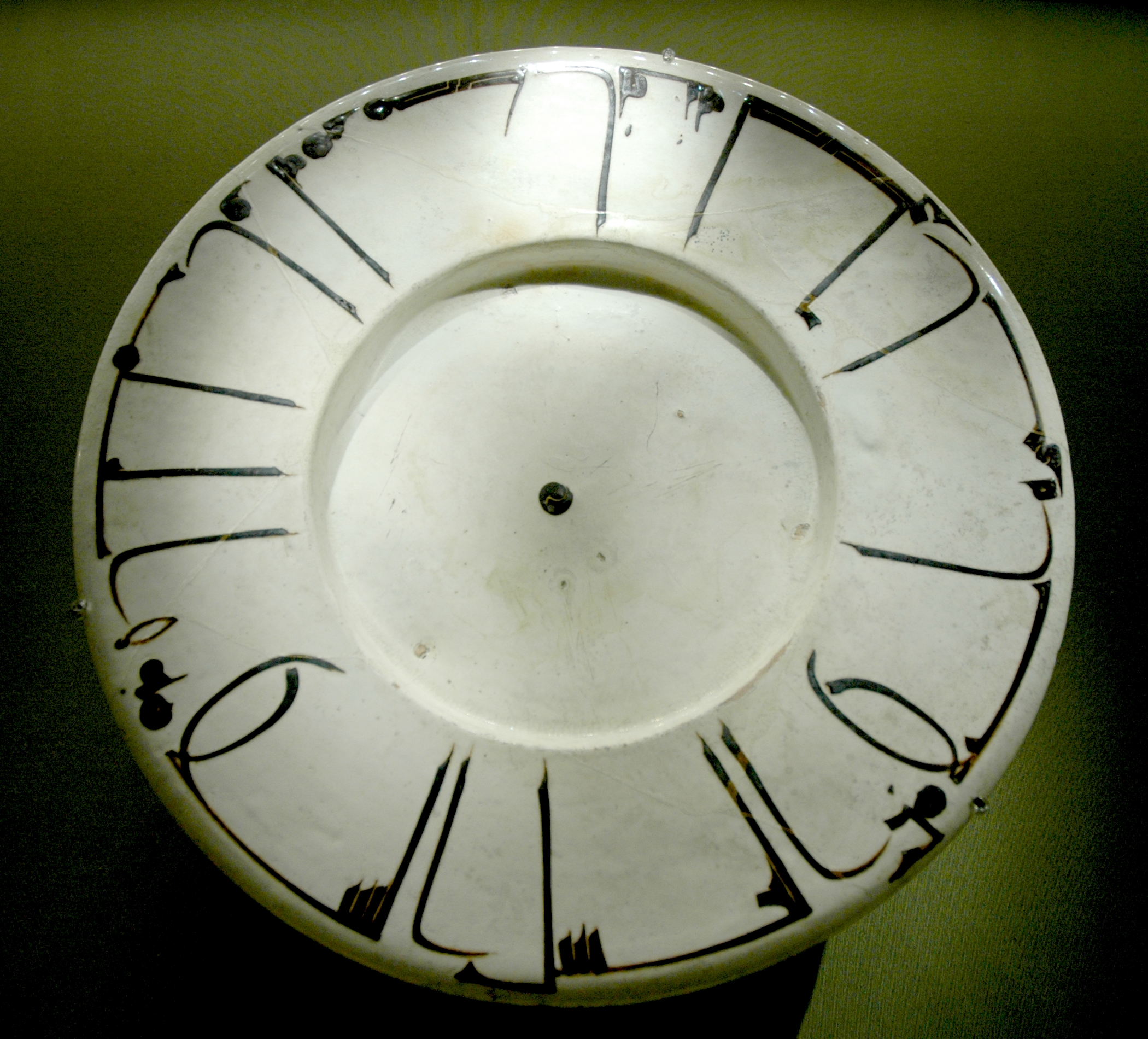
Dish with epigraphic decoration. The Kufic inscription reads: "Magnanimity has first a bitter taste, but at the end it tastes sweeter than honey. Good health [to the owner]." Terracotta, white slip ground and slip underglaze decoration, Nishapur, Khorasan (Iran), 11th–12th century.

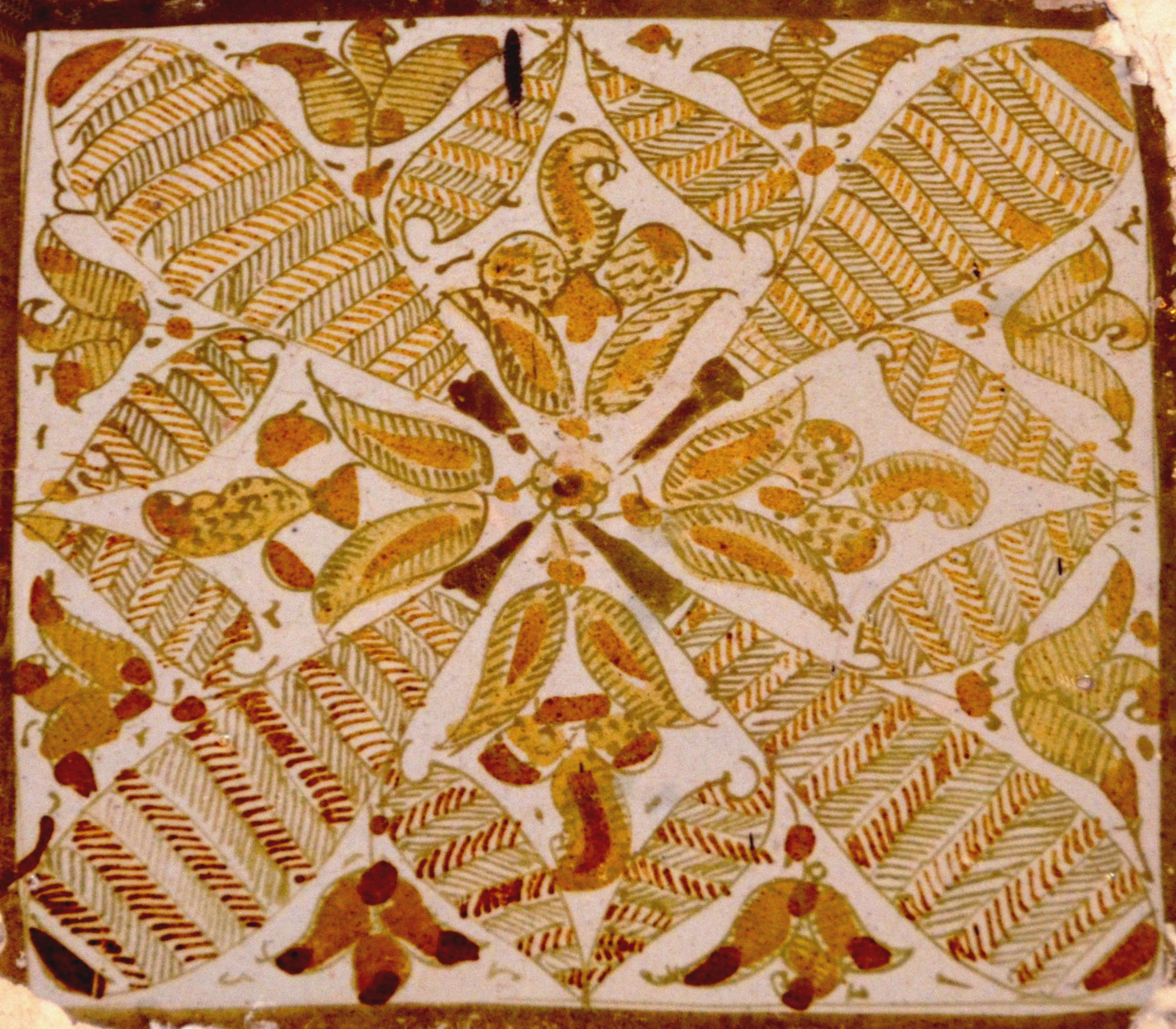
Baldosa of lustrada ceramics, dated del 862, manufactured in Mesopotamia in the Abbasid period. Decorated with foliage and hatching, formed part of a group of baldosas of ceramics with metallic reflections that adorn the upper part of the mihrab of the Gran Mezquita de Kairuán, in Tunisia.

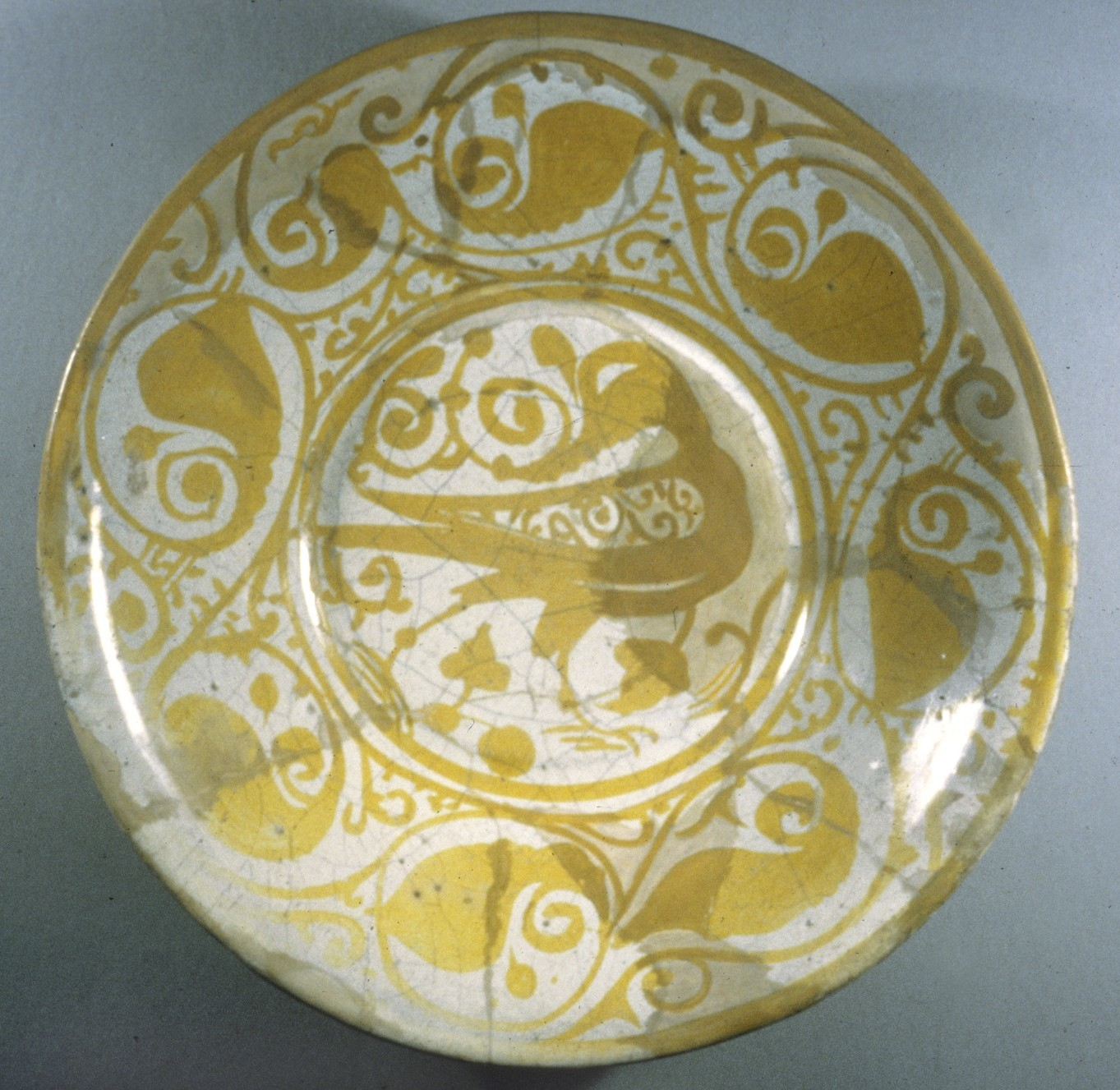
Fatimid Lusterware Plate with Bird Motif (11th century), from Egypt

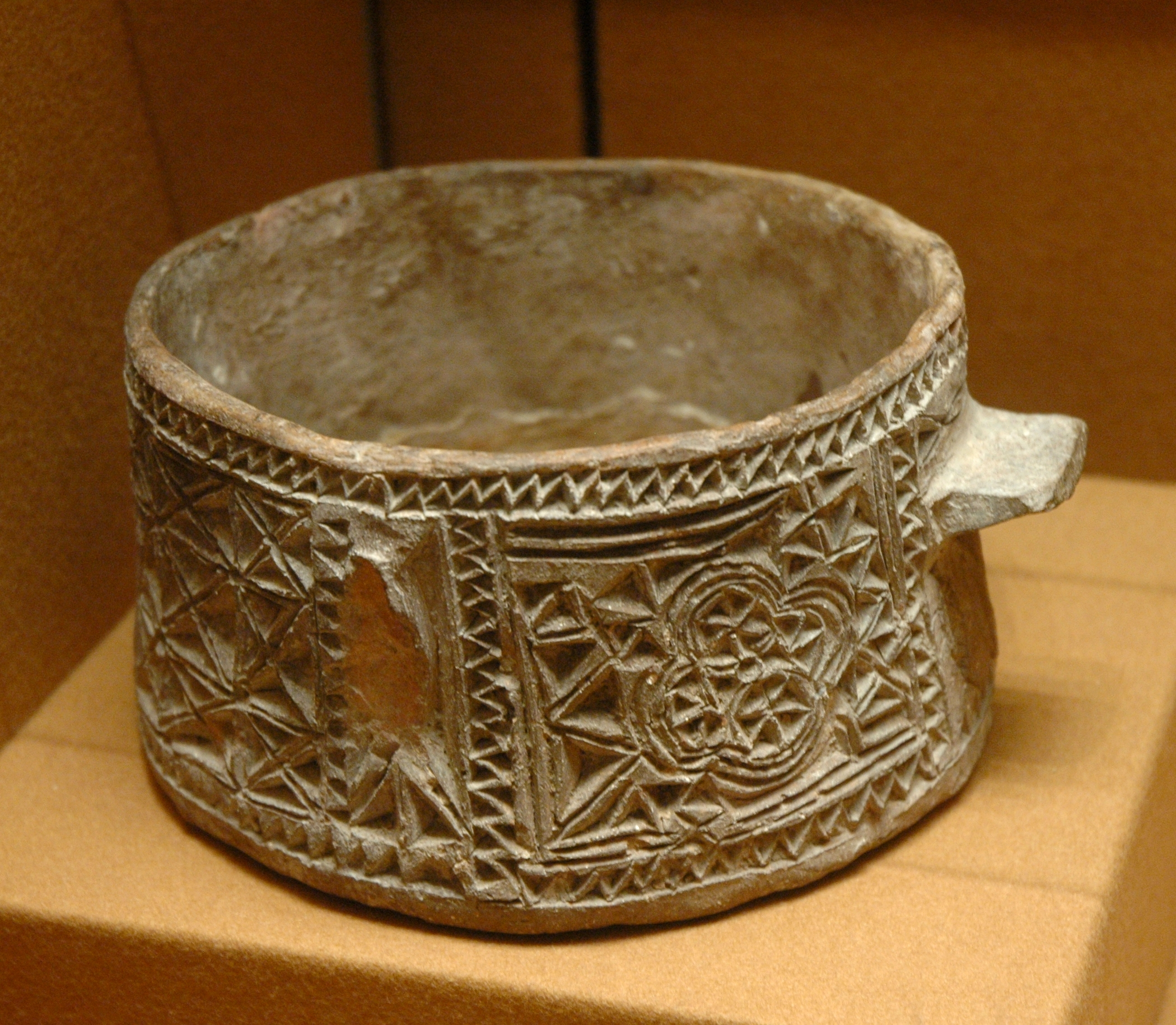
"Cooking-pot", Syria, 10th century, unglazed ceramic, champlevé decoration, Paris, Louvre MAO 279

A distinct Muslim style in pottery was not firmly established until the 9th century in Iraq (formerly Mesopotamia), Syria and Persia. During this period pieces mainly used white tin-glaze. Information on earlier periods is very limited. This is largely due to the lack of surviving specimens in good condition which also limits the interest in the study of ceramics of these periods. Archaeological excavations carried out in Jordan uncovered only a few examples from the Umayyad period, mostly unglazed vessels from Khirbat Al-Mafjar in Palestine. In the East, evidence shows that a production centre was set up in Samarkand under the Samanid dynasty who ruled this region and parts of Persia between 874 and 999 A.D. The most highly regarded technique of this centre is the use of calligraphy in the decoration of vessels. East Persian pottery from the 9th to 11th centuries decorated only with highly stylised inscriptions, called "epigraphic ware", has been described as "probably the most refined and sensitive of all Persian pottery".

=== Chinese influence ===
During the Abbasid dynasty pottery production gained momentum, largely using tin glazes mostly in the form of opaque white glaze. Some historians, such as Arthur Lane, attribute the rise of such industry to Chinese influence. Evidence from Muslim manuscripts, such as Akhbar al-Sin wa al-Hind (circa 851) and Ibn Kurdadhbih's Book of Roads and Provinces (846-885), suggest that trade with China was firmly established. Lane also referred to the passage in a work written by Muhammad ibn al-Husayn al-Baihaki, (circa 1059) where he stated that the governor of Khurasan, ‘Ali ibn ‘Isa, sent as a present to the Caliph Harun al-Rashid (786-809), “twenty pieces of Chinese Imperial porcelain (Chini faghfuri), the like of which had never been seen at a Caliph’s court before, in addition to 2,000 other pieces of porcelain”.

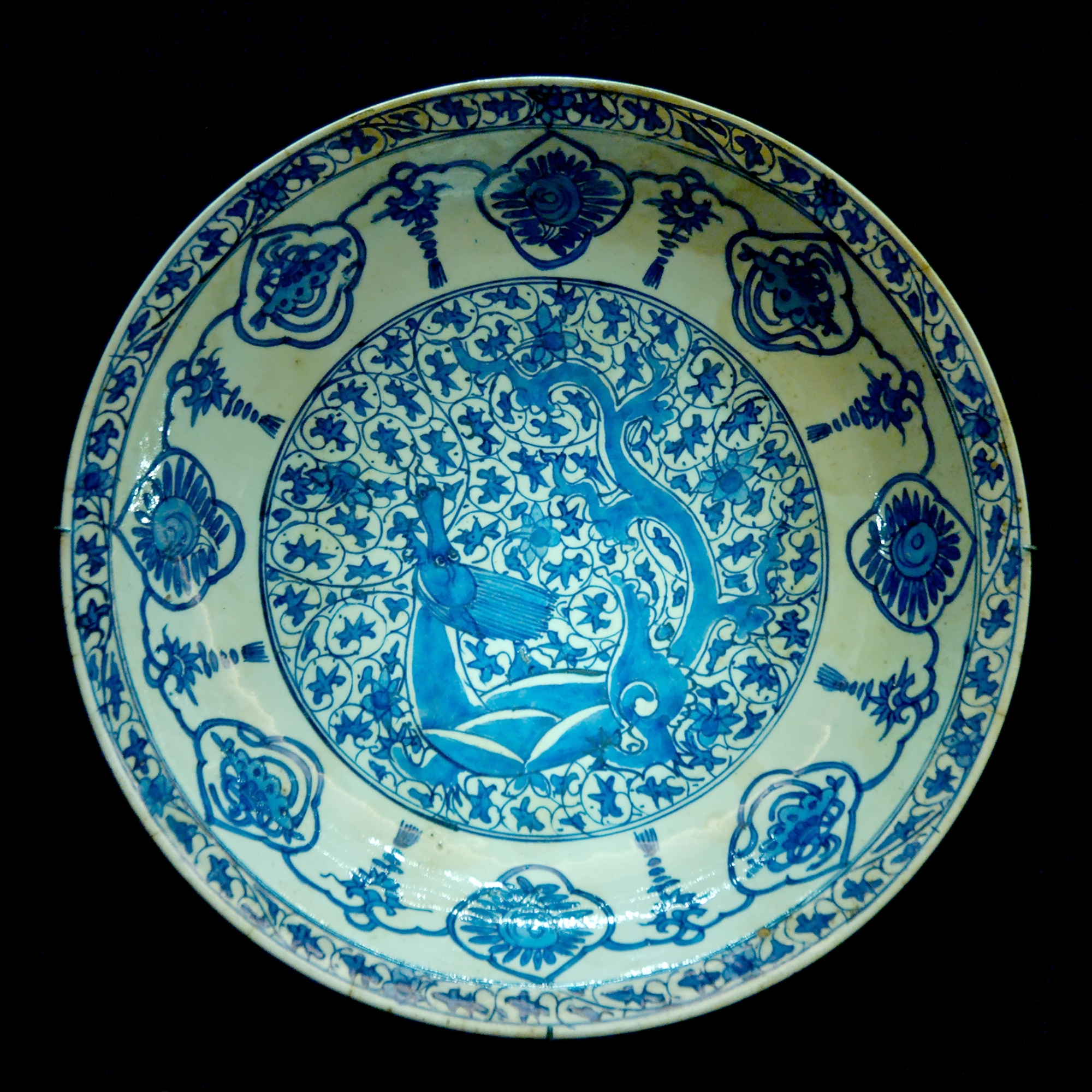
Plate with dragon. Persia, 17th century, inspired by 15th-century Chinese blue and white porcelain

According to Lane, the influence of Chinese pottery progressed in three main phases. The first contact with China took place in 751 when the Arabs defeated the Chinese at the Battle of Talas. It has been argued that imprisoned Chinese potters and paper makers could have taught the Muslims the art of pottery and paper-making. In the 800s Chinese stoneware and porcelain reached the Abbasids. The second phase took place in the twelfth and thirteenth centuries, a period noted for the decline of pottery industry following the fall of the Seljuk dynasty. This period also saw the invasion of the Mongols who brought Chinese pottery traditions.

The influence of ceramics from the Tang dynasty can be seen on lustrewares, produced by Mesopotamian potters, and on some early white wares excavated at Samarra (in modern-day Iraq). Ceramics from this period were excavated at Nishapur (in modern-day Iran) and Samarkand (in modern-day Uzbekistan).

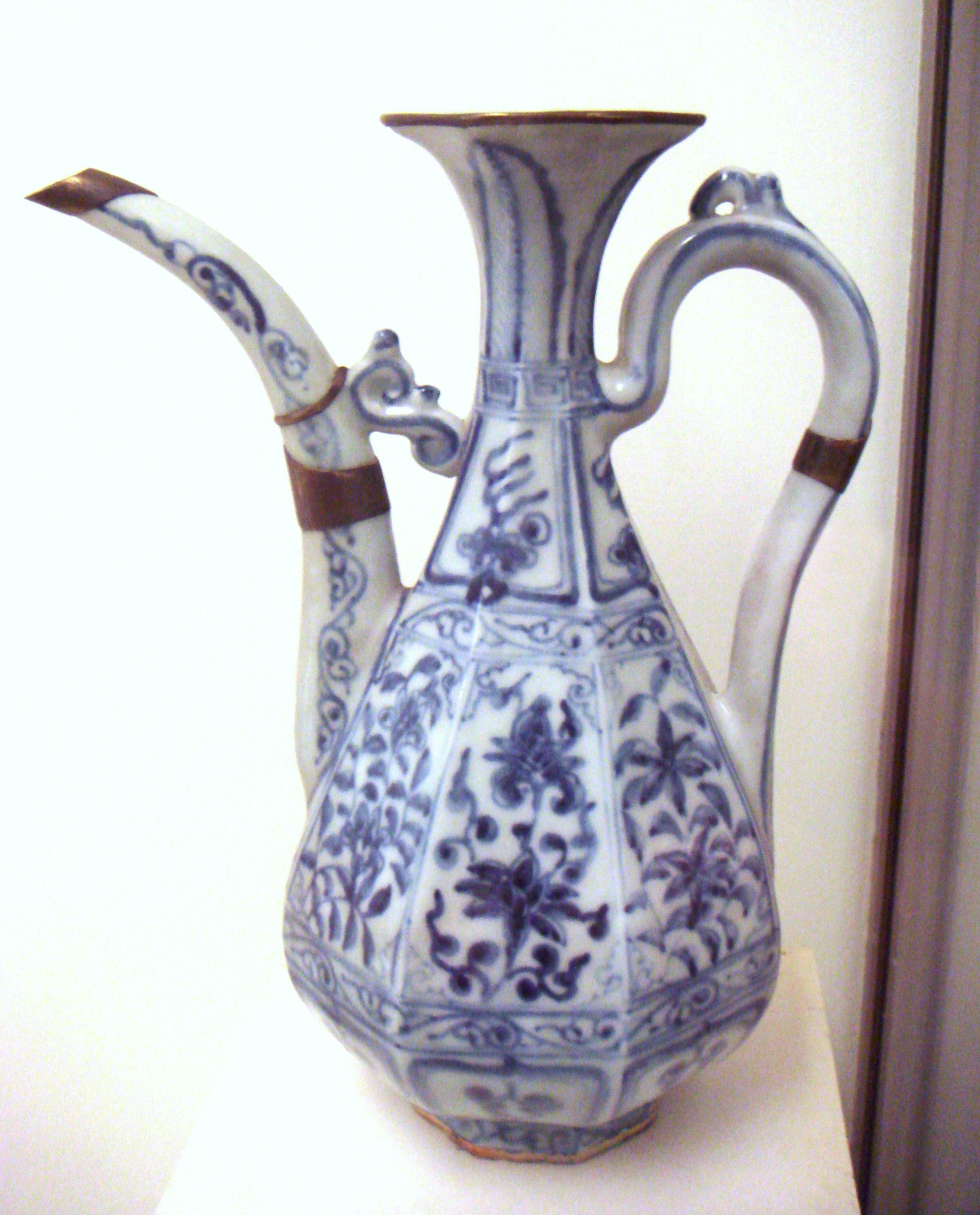
Early Chinese blue and white porcelain, c 1335, early Yuan dynasty, Jingdezhen, using a Middle-eastern shape.

By the time of the Mongol invasion of China a considerable export trade westwards to the Islamic world was established, and Islamic attempts to imitate Chinese porcelain in their own fritware bodies had begun in the 12th century. These were less successful than those of Korean pottery, but eventually were able to provide attractive local competition to Chinese imports. Chinese production could adapt to the preferences of foreign markets; larger celadon dishes than the Chinese market wanted were favoured for serving princely banquets in the Middle East. Celadon wares were believed there to have the ability to detect poison, by sweating or breaking.

The Islamic market was apparently especially important in the early years of Chinese blue and white porcelain, which appears to have been mainly exported until the Ming. Again, large dishes were an export style, and the densely painted decoration of Yuan blue and white borrowed heavily from the arabesques and plant scrolls of Islamic decoration, probably mostly taking the style from metalwork examples, which also provided shapes for some vessels. This style of ornament was then confined to blue and white, and is not found in the red and white painted wares then preferred by the Chinese themselves. The cobalt blue that was used was itself imported from Persia, and the export trade in porcelain was handled by colonies of Muslim merchants in Quanzhou, convenient for the huge Jingdezhen potteries, and other ports to the south.

The start of the Ming dynasty was quickly followed by a decree of 1368, forbidding trade with foreign countries. This was not entirely successful, and had to be repeated several times, and the giving of lavish imperial diplomatic gifts continued, concentrating on silk and porcelain (19,000 pieces of porcelain in 1383), but it severely set back the export trade. The policy was relaxed under the next emperor after 1403, but had by then greatly stimulated the production of pottery emulating Chinese styles in the Islamic world itself, which was by now reaching a high level of quality in several countries (high enough to fool contemporary Europeans in many cases).

Often Islamic production imitated not the latest Chinese styles, but those of the late Yuan and early Ming. In turn, Chinese potters began in the early 16th century to produce some items in overtly Islamic styles, including jumbled inscriptions in Arabic. These appear to have been made for the growing Chinese Muslim market, and probably those at court wishing to keep up with the Zhengde Emperor's (r. 1505–1521) flirtation with Islam.

=== Islamic innovations ===
From between the eighth and eighteenth centuries, the use of glazed ceramics was prevalent in Islamic art, usually assuming the form of elaborate pottery. Tin-opacified glazing, for the production of tin-glazed pottery, was one of the earliest new technologies developed by the Islamic potters. Robert B. Mason notes, though, that petrograph analysis revealed some "tin-glazed" pottery to contain quarts and feldspar to attain opacity. The first Islamic opaque glazes can be found as blue-painted ware in Basra, dating to around the 8th century. Another significant contribution was the development of stoneware originating in 9th-century Iraq. It was a vitreous or semivitreous ceramic ware of fine texture, made primarily from non-refactory fire clay. Other centres for innovative pottery in the Islamic world included Fustat (from 975 to 1075), Damascus (from 1100 to around 1600) and Tabriz (from 1470 to 1550).

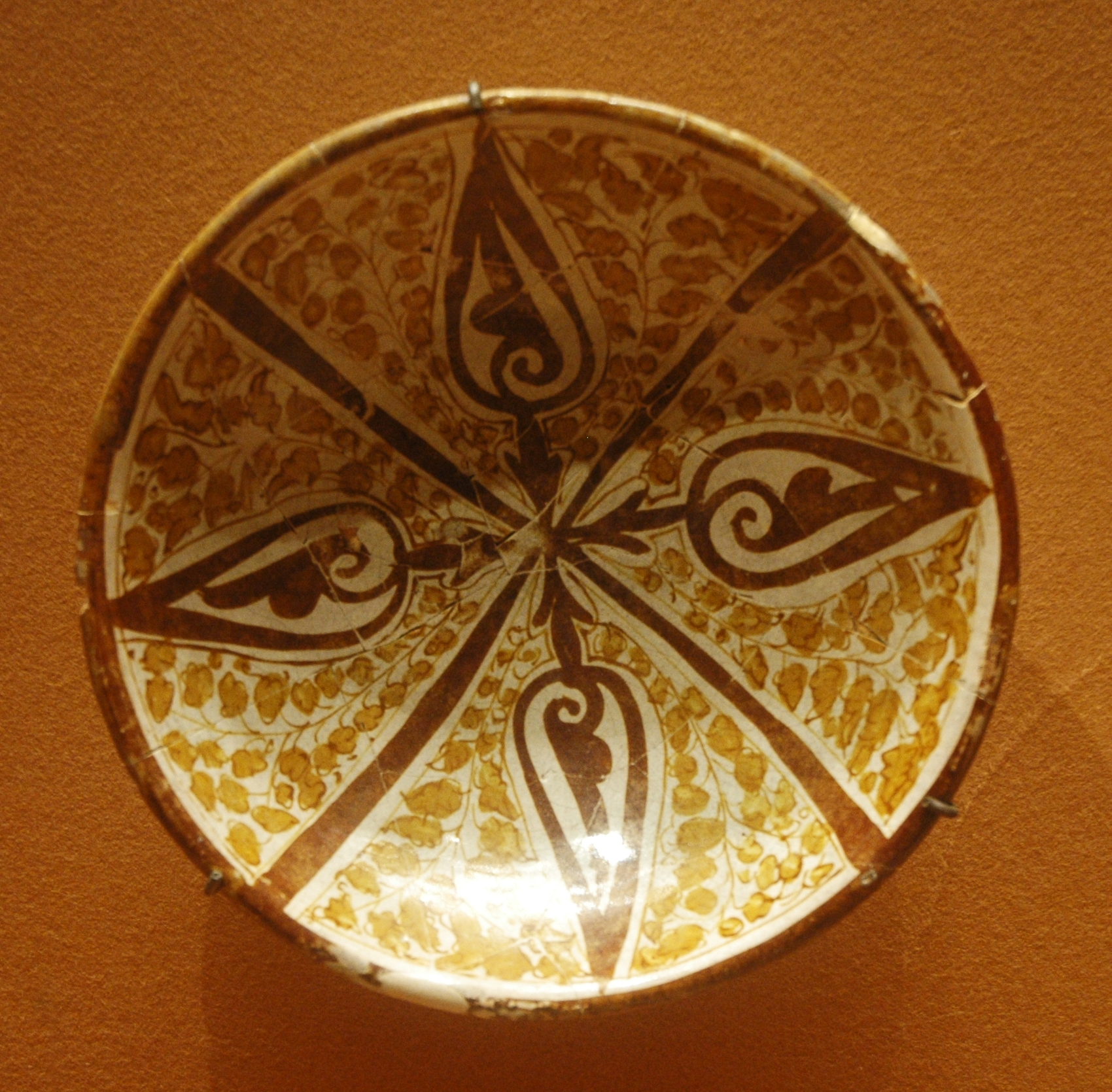
Abbasid-era 9th-century lustreware bowl from Iraq

Lusterware was produced in Mesopotamia in the 9th century; the technique soon became popular in Persia and Syria. Lusterware was later produced in Egypt during the Fatimid caliphate in the 10th-12th centuries. While some production of lustreware continued in the Middle East, it spread to Europe—first in the Hispano-Moresque ware of Al-Andalus, notably at Málaga, and then Valencia, then later to Italy, where it was used to enhance maiolica.

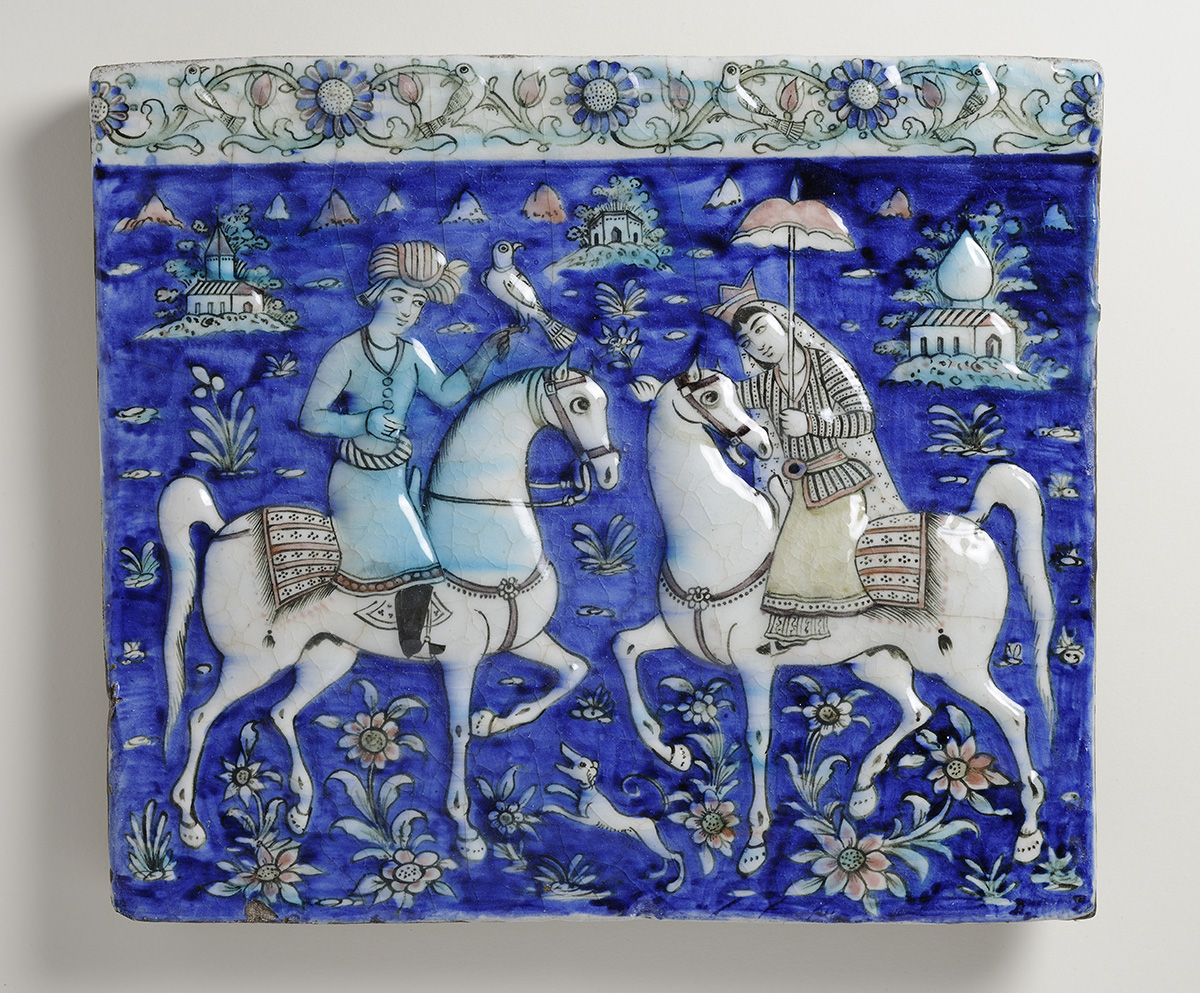
A horseman and a horsewoman, Tile, 19th century, Tehran, Museum of Fine Arts of Lyon

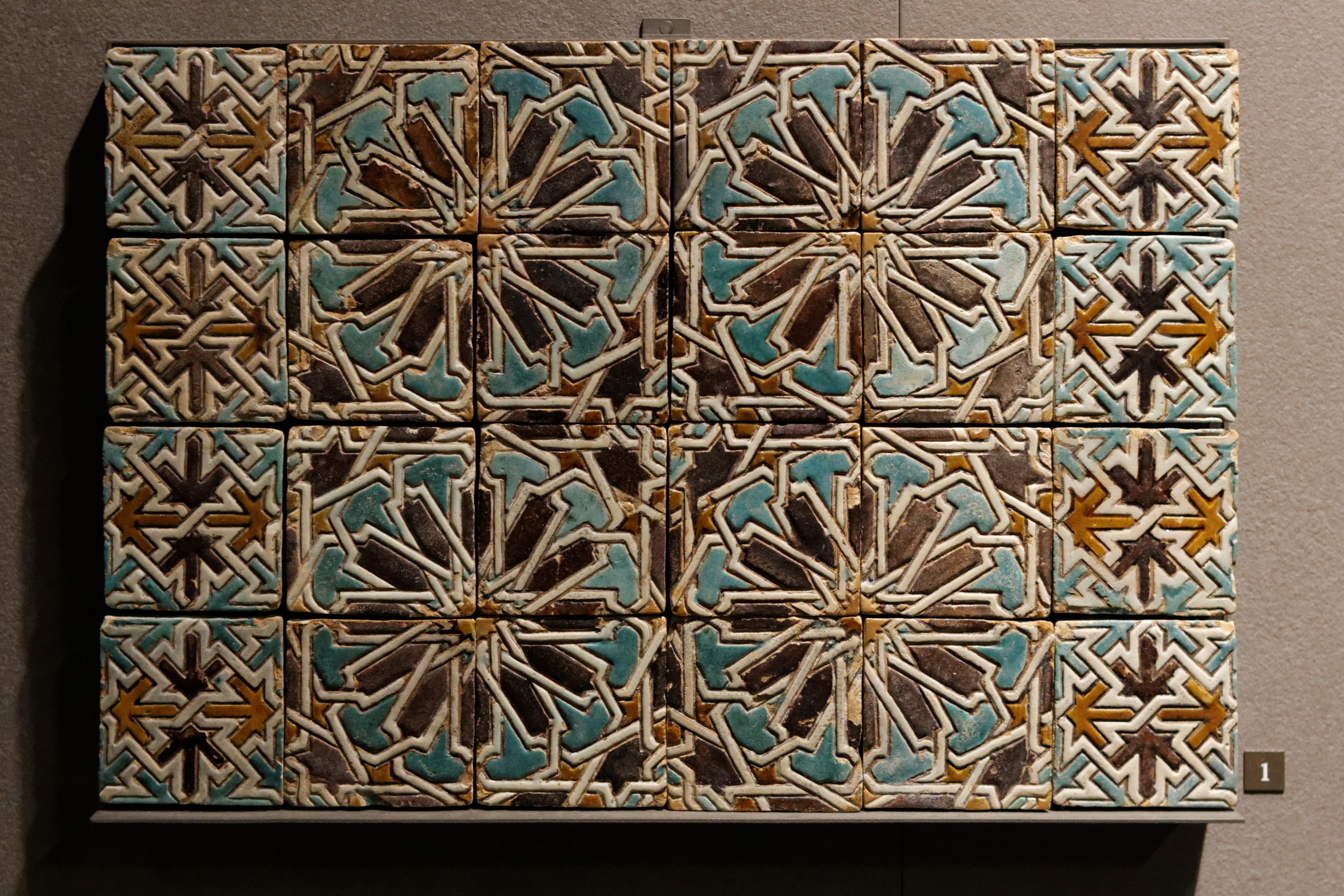
Wall covering tiles with cuerda seca decor.

Another innovation was the albarello, a type of maiolica earthenware jar originally designed to hold apothecaries' ointments and dry drugs. The development of this type of pharmacy jar had its roots in the Islamic Middle East. Brought to Italy from Spain, the earliest Italian examples were produced in Florence in the 15th century.

Fritware refers to a type of pottery which was first developed in the Near East, where production is dated to the late first millennium AD through the second millennium AD. Frit was a significant ingredient. A recipe for “fritware” dating to c. 1300 AD written by Abu’l Qasim reports that the ratio of quartz to “frit-glass” to white clay is 10:1:1. This type of pottery has also been referred to as “stoneware" and “faience” among other names. A ninth-century corpus of “proto-stoneware” from Baghdad has “relict glass fragments” in its fabric. The glass is alkali-lime-lead-silica and, when the paste was fired or cooled, wollastonite and diopside crystals formed within the glass fragments. The lack of “inclusions of crushed pottery” suggests these fragments did not come from a glaze. The reason for their addition would be to act as a flux, and so “accelerate vitrification at a relatively low firing temperature, and thus increase the hardness and density of the [ceramic] body.”

== Middle (1200–1400) ==
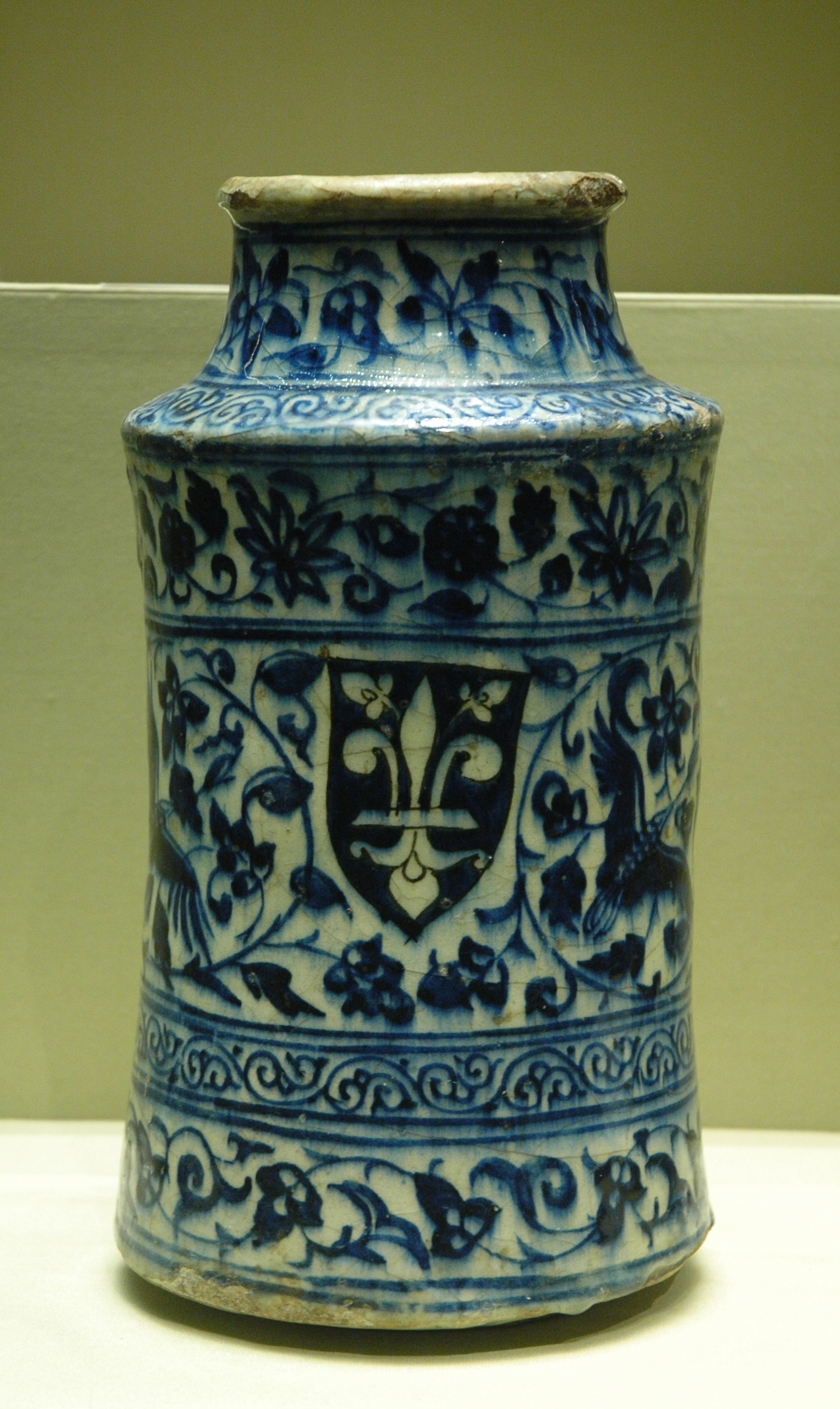
Albarello with fleur-de-lys decoration, early 14th century, Syria, musée du Louvre

By this period the distinctive Islamic tradition of decorated wall tiles had emerged, and continued to develop together with vessel pottery in a way unique to Islamic art. In the account of Ibn Naji (circa 1016) the Caliph sent, in addition to tiles, “a man from Baghdad” to Kairouan to produce lustre tiles for the mihrab of the Great Mosque (still well preserved). Georges Marçais suggested that Iraqi potters indeed came to Kairouan. The arrival of this Baghdadi potter must have led to the establishment of a satellite centre for the production of ceramics in Kairouan, but no information has yet been developed to confirm or deny this suggestion.

The events leading to the collapse of the Fatimid reign in 1171 caused ceramic production to move out to new centres, via processes similar to those described above with respect to Iraq. As a result, Persia became a centre of revival under the Seljuk rule (1038–1327). This is not coincidental as the Seljuks expanded their rule over Persia, Iraq, Syria, and Palestine, as well as Anatolia and Muslim Asia Minor. All of these had been, for some considerable time, centres of old pottery.

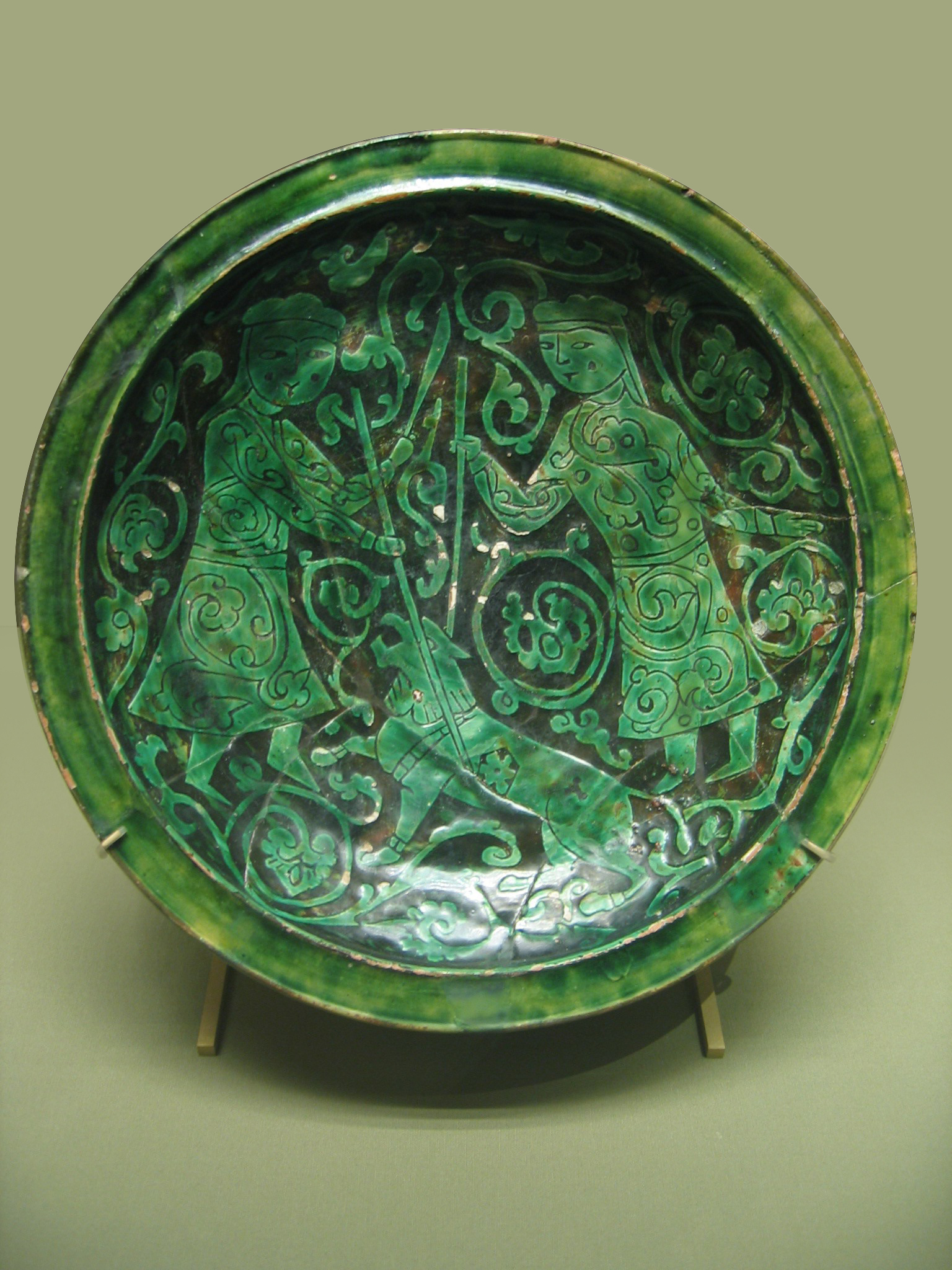
Bowl with hunters, Persian pottery from 12th–13th century.

The Seljuks brought new and fresh inspiration to the Muslim world, attracting artists, craftsmen and potters from all regions including Egypt. In addition to continuing the production of similar (although more refined) tin and lustre glaze ceramics, the Seljuks (in Persia) were credited for the introduction of a new type sometimes known as "Faience". This is made from a hard white frit paste coated with transparent alkaline glaze.

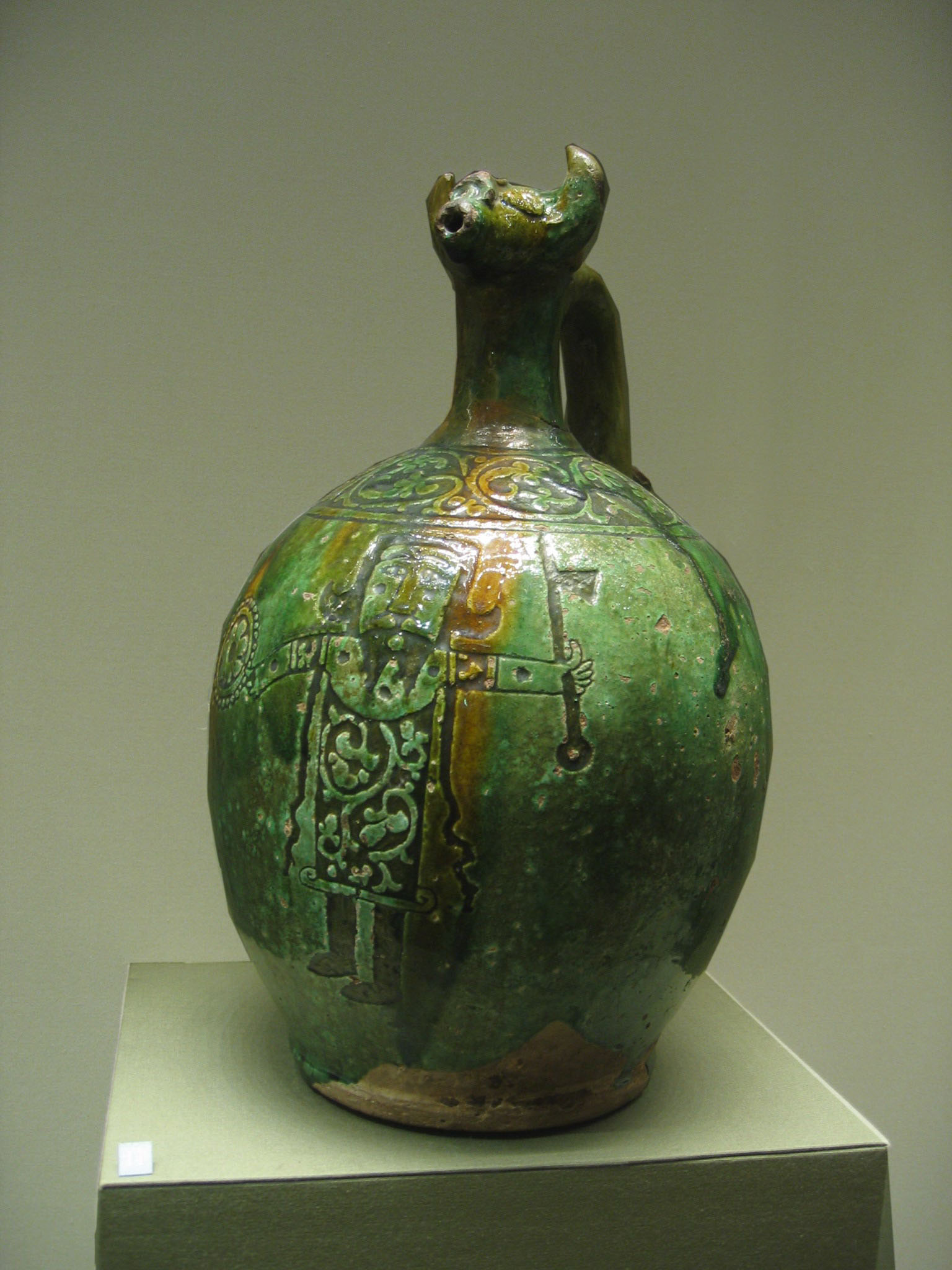
Ewer with animal head, Iran, Zenjan region, Gerrus district, 12th–13th century, clay pottery engraved decoration under colored transparent glaze, Louvre Museum.

Hispano-Moresque ware emerged in Al-Andalus in the 13th century, probably after potters escaped the instability after the fall of the Fatimids. It introduced lustreware manufacture to Europe and from the start was widely exported to the elites of Christian kingdoms. The first centre was Málaga, producing wares in traditional Islamic styles, but from the 13th century Muslim potters migrated to the reconquered Christian city of Valencia, outlying suburbs of which such as Manises and Paterna became the most important centres, manufacturing mainly for Christian markets in styles increasingly influenced by European decoration, though retaining a distinct character. The potters were mostly still Muslim or Morisco.

In a rare manuscript from Kashan compiled by Abulqassim in 1301, there is a complete description of how faience production was carried out. Frit was made of ten parts of powdered quartz, one part of clay and one part of glaze mixture. The addition of greater amounts of clay made wheel throwing of the faience easier, and allowed a better quality of work, because otherwise the material had little plasticity. The glaze itself is “formed of a roughly equal mixture of ground quartz and the ashes of desert plants which contain a very high proportion of alkaline salts. These act as a flux and cause the quartz to vitrify at a manageable temperature. The two alone will produce a transparent glaze”. Lane compared this material with the French pâte tender, which was used by potters as recently as the eighteenth century. This body material and the new glaze offered the potter a greater handling and manipulation ability. This allows the potter to improve the quality and appearance of the vessel, including more refined decorative designs and patterns. The result was a substantial variety of products such as bowls of different size and shapes, jugs, incense burners, lamps, candlesticks, trays, tiles and so on. These advantages also allowed greater control of carved decoration, the use of which the Seljuks refined and extended during the twelfth century.

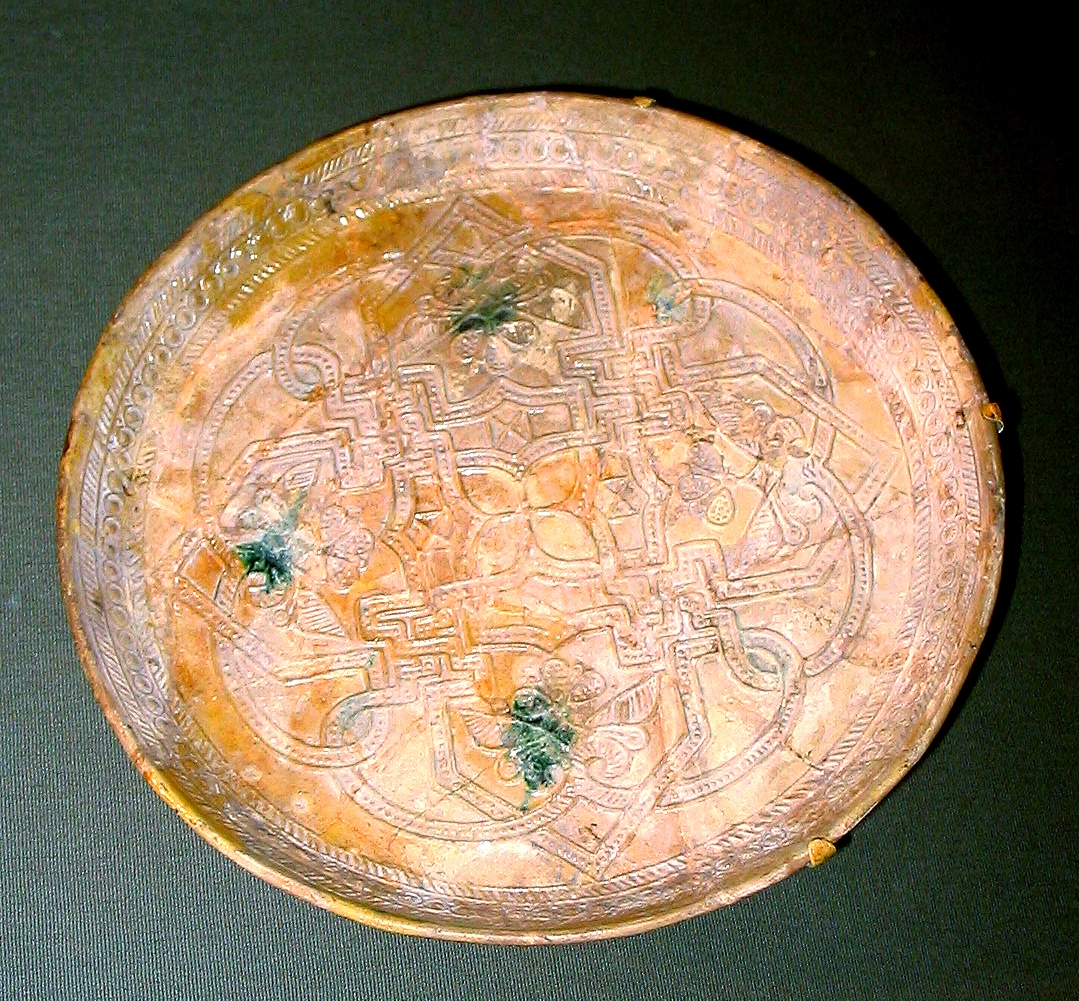
Molded flat -decor dish, Iraq, ninth century, freer gallery from Washington

One example of frit ware are Lajvardina ceramics, which were produced under the Ikhanids and are recognisable by their often dark blue underglazes and patterned decorations.

Carved decoration in ceramics, sgraffito, is an old tradition used in ninth-century Islamic pottery; it is an engraving technique based on incising the design with a sharp tool through a white slip to reveal the red earthenware body. The vessel is then coated with glaze.

The Seljuks also developed the so-called silhouette wares which are distinguished by their black background. These are produced by a technique which consists of coating the white fritware body with a thick black slip, out of which the decoration is then carved. Later, a coat of colourless or coloured, usually blue or green, transparent glaze is applied. According to Lane, this technique was used, in a simpler form, in Samarkand between the ninth and tenth centuries. The method then consisted of mixing the colours with a thick opaque clay slip instead.

== Late/post-medieval (1400–onward) ==
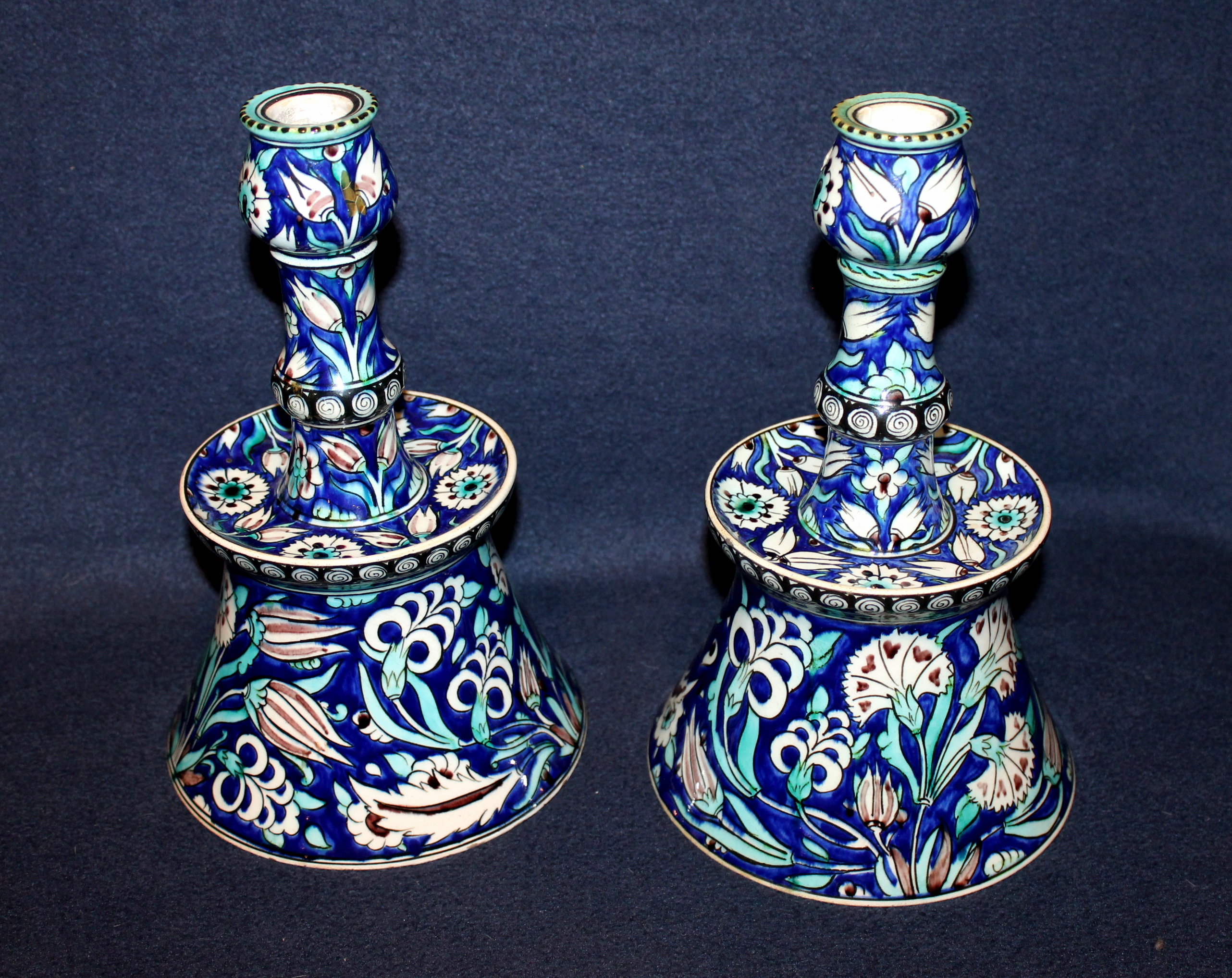
İznik Pottery Candlesticks, Ottoman Turkey

The influence of Blue and white porcelain of the Yuan and Ming dynasties is evident in many ceramics made by Muslim potters. İznik pottery from around İznik in Anatolia was supported by the Ottoman court and produced the finest Ottoman work in pottery and panels of tiles, using the same vocabulary of bold and elegant floral designs derived from Chinese decoration. A characteristic bold red was developed. İznik ware had a major influence on European decorative arts: for example, on Italian Maiolica. The pottery was produced in as early as the 15th century AD, and was preceded by Miletus ware from the same region. Its best period lasted until the late 16th century. It consists of a body, slip, and glaze, where the body and glaze are “quartz-frit.” The “frits” in both cases “are unusual in that they contain lead oxide as well as soda”; the lead oxide would help reduce the thermal expansion coefficient of the ceramic. Microscopic analysis reveals that the material that has been labeled “frit” is “interstitial glass” which serves to connect the quartz particles. Michael S. Tite argues that this glass was added as frit and that the interstitial glass formed on firing.

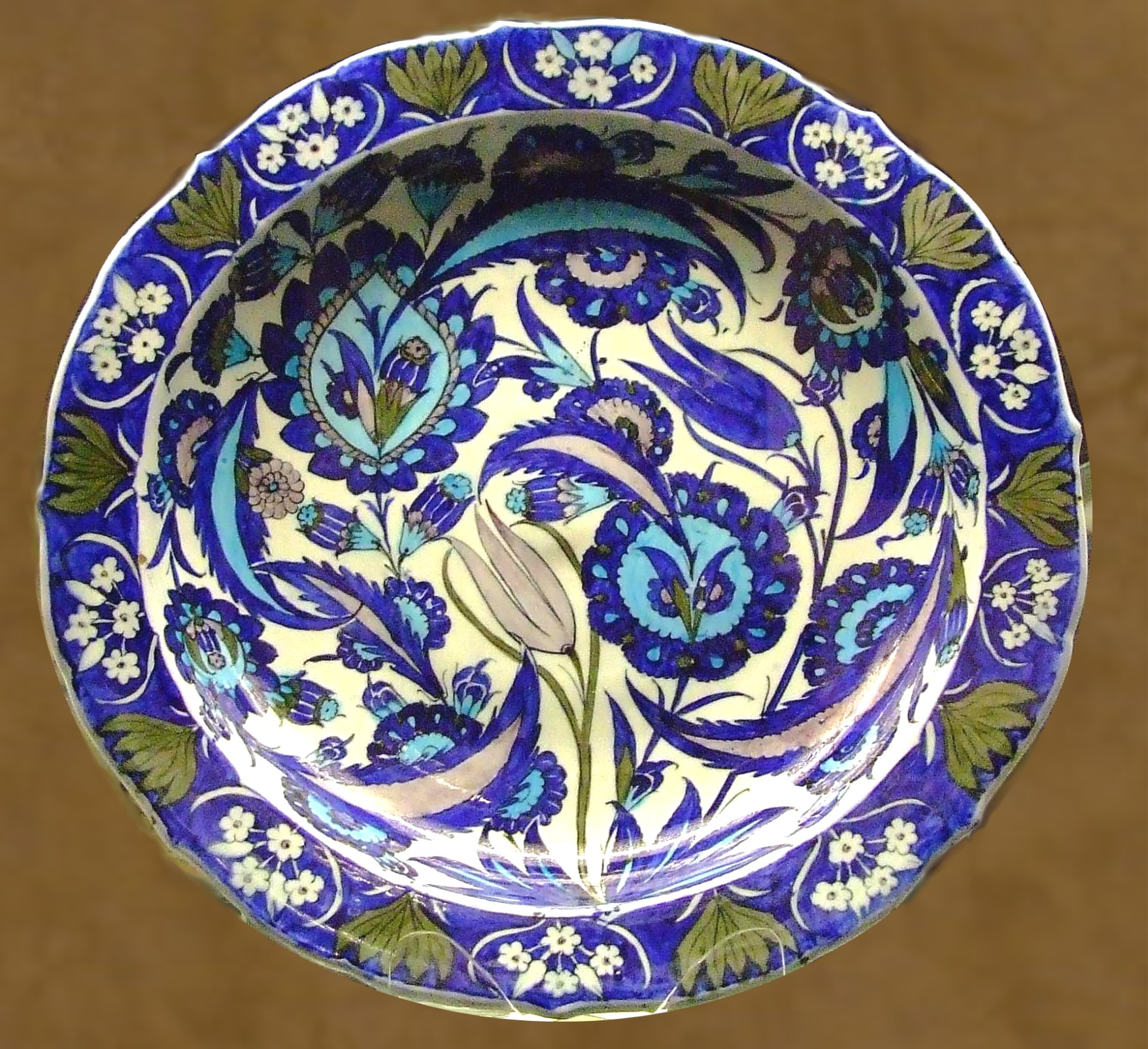
İznik dish

The 15th century saw the finest period of the Hispano-Moresque ware of Valencia, produced by largely Muslim potters in a Christian kingdom, though the southern industry centred on Málaga had ended by the mid-century. Persian pottery under the Safavid dynasty (from 1502) was also heavily influenced by Chinese blue and white porcelain, which to a large extent replaced it in court circles; fine 16th-century Persian pieces are very rare.

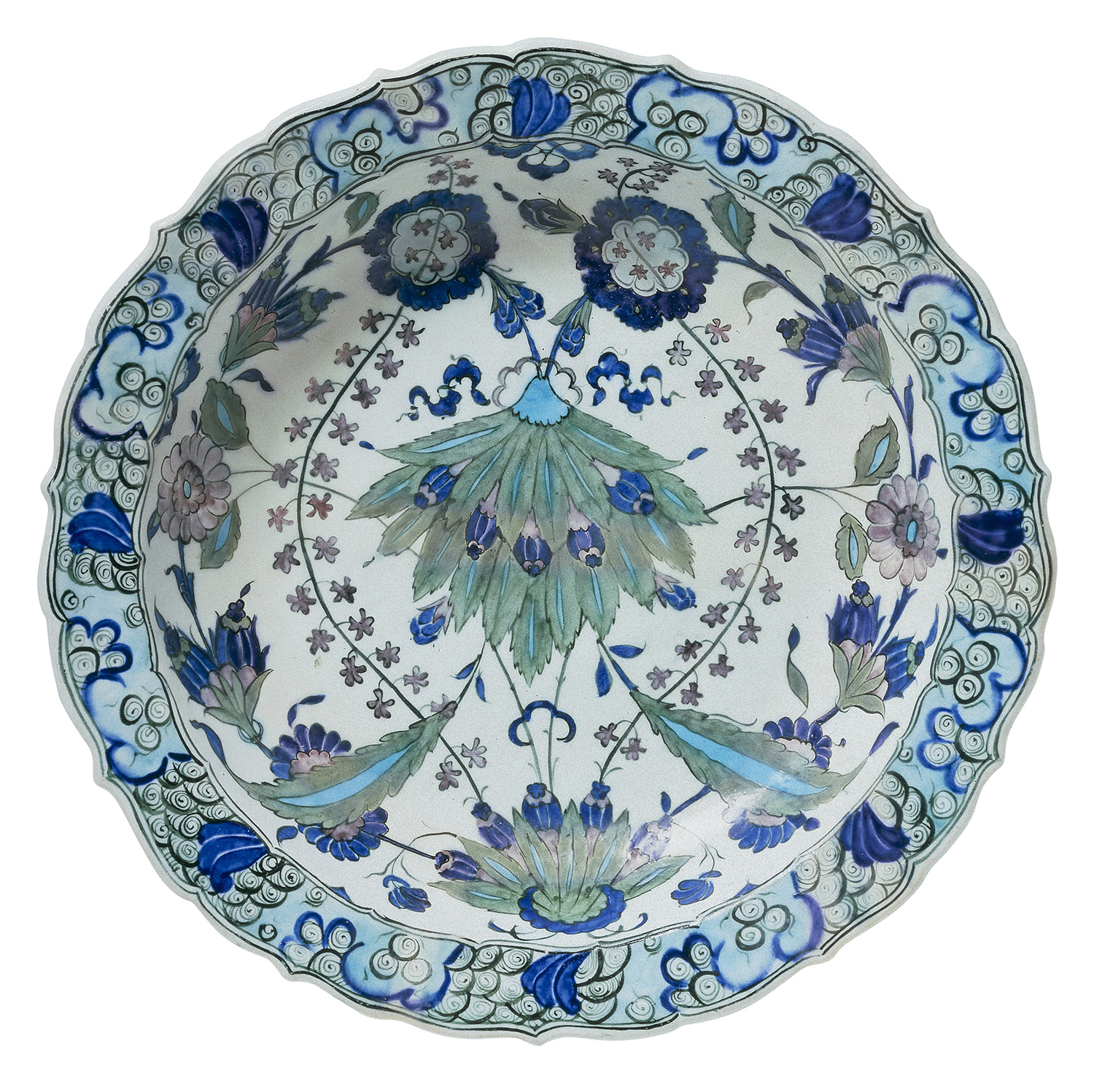
Contoured marli dish decorated with a large composite flower, Iznik, Ottoman Turkey, circa 1550–1560, Lyon Museum of Fine Arts

The Islamic parts of Southeast Asia, modern Indonesia and Malaysia, were export markets that were close at hand for the Chinese and later the Japanese, helped by the European trading companies, especially the Dutch East India Company. The Buddhist countries of the region also exported. Special types of wares were developed for them, such as the Chinese Kraak ware and Swatow ware, mostly producing large dishes for serving communally to a table. In the face of such competition, local wares were few and simple.

The medieval Islamic world as a whole never managed to develop porcelain, but had an avid appetite for imports of it. East Asian porcelain, first Chinese then Japanese export porcelain in the 17th century, was joined in the 18th century by the wares from Europe, in particular Vienna porcelain, which specialized in the Eastern market, and by the latter part of the century was sending as many as 120,000 pieces per year to the Ottoman Empire, many small cups and saucers for Turkish coffee. The smaller scale factories of the Islamic world could not compete with the sophisticated imports arriving from both east and west, and local production became a craft affair, repeating now-traditional patterns.

== Study of Islamic pottery ==
Arthur Lane produced two books which made substantial contribution to understanding the history and merit of Muslim ceramics. The first book was dedicated to the study of early ceramics from the Abbasid period till the Seljuk times, sketching the various events which played a significant role in the rise and fall of particular styles. In his second work, Lane used the same rhetorical style adopted in the first book, this time devoting his attention to later periods from the Mongols to nineteenth-century İznik and Persian pottery.

Following Lane's works, numerous studies appeared. The most comprehensive works adopting a general view are those by R.L. Hobson, Ernst J. Grube, Richard Ettinghausen, and more recently Alan Caiger-Smith and Gesa Febervari. Additional contributions were made by those specializing in particular temporal or regional history of Muslim pottery such as Georges Marcais in his work on North Africa, Oliver Watson on Persia and J.R. Hallett on Abbasid Pottery.

== See also ==
- İznik pottery
- Kiln
- Persian pottery
- Dish with epigraphic decoration
- Mina'i ware
