= Compendiario =

Style of Italian maiolica decoration characterized by simplified, rapid brushwork

Maiolica plate in the Compendiario style, Faenza, 1550–1600, National Gallery of Victoria

Compendiario (Italian for abridged or concise) is a style of decoration associated particularly with Italian maiolica, characterized by simplified imagery, a restricted palette and rapid, summary brushwork. It emerged in Faenza, Italy, in the mid-16th century and became especially important in the production known as the bianchi di Faenza ("Faenza whites"), in which a brilliant white tin glaze was left largely visible and was enlivened by sparse painted motifs.

The decoration is typically executed on a white, opaque tin glaze, with figures, heraldic emblems, putti, garlands, animals or other motifs rendered in a limited range of colours, especially blue, yellow and orange. Instead of the elaborate and densely coloured compositions characteristic of much earlier Renaissance maiolica, the painted image is often reduced to a few animated figures or a single emblematic motif, leaving large areas of the white ground exposed.

The term compendiario was adopted in modern scholarship from the Latin phrase pictura compendiaria, used in discussions of ancient painting. The ancient term is attested in Pliny the Elder's Naturalis Historia, where Pliny says that the Greek painter Philoxenus of Eretria devised especially abbreviated forms of painting in pursuit of speed. Later scholarship has associated the expression with summary or impressionistic painting techniques, including developments within Hellenistic art and Roman painting, but the precise character and geographical origin of the ancient technique remain debated.

== History ==
=== Ancient use of the term ===
The ancient expression pictura compendiaria occurs in Roman literary sources. In Book 35 of his Natural History, Pliny the Elder describes Philoxenus of Eretria, a Greek painter active in the late 4th century BC, as having followed the speed of his teacher and invented still shorter forms of painting. The passage has traditionally been taken as evidence for a rapid, summary manner of execution, although the exact technical meaning of compendiaria is uncertain.

The adjective was subsequently used by modern art historians to describe certain forms of abbreviated painting in the Hellenistic and Roman traditions. In this later historiographical use, "compendiary" may refer to figures and landscapes rendered with a minimum of lines and touches of colour rather than fully modelled or meticulously outlined forms. The surviving evidence does not, however, justify identifying a single, clearly defined "Alexandrian school" as the direct source of the later ceramic style.

=== Italian maiolica ===
In the history of Italian maiolica, compendiario denotes a decorative manner that developed in Faenza during the 16th century. Around the 1540s, Faenza potters developed a new kind of maiolica in which the earthenware body was covered by a thicker, tin-rich, brilliant white glaze. The elaborate painting of earlier luxury maiolica was replaced in part by rapid and sketchy decoration in blue and a small number of additional colours.

The resulting ware is closely associated with the so-called bianchi di Faenza ("Faenza whites"). The Museo Internazionale delle Ceramiche in Faenza describes these as Renaissance maiolica dominated by white glaze and decorated in a synthetic manner with rapid and essential brushstrokes. Their popularity extended from the second half of the 16th century through the following century, and the style was imitated in other Italian ceramic centres.

Compendiario decoration is usually characterized by a white ground, deliberately exposed over much of the surface, and by a restricted palette. Blue or turquoise, yellow and orange are common, sometimes accompanied by brown or other colours. The central field may contain a putto, a solitary figure, an animal, a coat of arms or a small figurative episode, sometimes surrounded by a simple garland or other linear ornament.

The style represented a change from the dense polychromy and complex pictorial programmes associated with earlier Renaissance maiolica. The combination of a luminous white glaze, simplified decoration and elaborate vessel forms allowed the objects to retain an appearance of luxury while reducing the quantity and complexity of painted decoration.

==== Faenza ====
Faenza was the principal centre in the development of the Italian compendiario manner. The transition toward the bianchi involved a group of Faenza workshops active in the middle and later decades of the 16th century. Among the best-documented masters associated with this production were Virgilio Calamelli, known as Virgiliotto, and Leonardo Bettisi, known as Don Pino.

Calamelli belonged to the group of Faenza masters responsible for the "white" revolution of the mid-16th century. Contemporary and later descriptions emphasize the thick, opaque and velvety white glaze, the limited palette of blue, yellow and orange, and the rapid, sketch-like treatment of figures and emblems.

Bettisi was one of the most important masters of the Faenza white tradition. Works associated with his workshop include both almost completely white wares and pieces carrying compendiario decoration, often restricted to a putto, a woman, or an heraldic emblem surrounded by vegetal ornament and large expanses of white glaze.

Gaetano Ballardini, the founder and long-time director of the Museo Internazionale delle Ceramiche in Faenza, was responsible for establishing the modern use of the term compendiario for this type of maiolica decoration. His studies of Faenza ceramics were published extensively from the early 20th century, including an important article in Dedalo in 1929–1930.

==== Montelupo ====
Compendiario decoration also occurs in the ceramic production of Montelupo Fiorentino. Objects from the later 16th and early 17th centuries may display summary figurative decoration, restricted colour ranges and large white areas. The Italian State catalogue for a Montelupo object notes, however, that the term compendiario has been applied somewhat broadly by later scholars and can overlap with the late development of the earlier istoriato tradition.

A surviving example in the collection of the Museo Internazionale delle Ceramiche in Faenza is a Montelupo crespina described as having a central feline figure executed in the compendiario style and dated to the first half of the 17th century.

==== Deruta ====
The Deruta ceramic tradition adopted the compendiario manner as part of the evolution of white-ground maiolica in the late 16th and 17th centuries. The Museo Regionale della Ceramica di Deruta includes a specific section devoted to 17th-century "compendiary" production, demonstrating the importance of the style within the local tradition.

Nicola Francioli, an important Deruta painter of the early 16th century, is associated with the development of white-ground maiolica in the town. A document of 1550 records a commission from Pellina Montemelini for a group of vessels described as white and bearing coats of arms, providing evidence for the early circulation of such wares in Umbria.

==== Laterza ====
The Laterza maiolica tradition was also influenced by the compendiario manner. The Museo della Maiolica di Laterza identifies examples in its collections dating from the 16th century as being in the "compendiario" style, while the development of Laterza maiolica continued through the 17th and 18th centuries.

Laterza compendiario decoration is generally characterized by a white ground and a small number of colours, particularly blue, yellow and orange. The style forms part of a broader exchange of decorative models between southern Italian centres and the major artistic environment of Naples.

==== Castelli ====
At Castelli in Abruzzo, compendiario decoration remained important during the 17th century. The tradition was subsequently transformed by painters such as Francesco Grue, who revived the more pictorial and narrative istoriato manner.

Francesco Grue is described by Treccani as the major innovator of Castelli maiolica in the 17th century; earlier production at Castelli included wares decorated in the compendiario manner, whereas Grue deliberately returned to Renaissance historiated painting.

== Characteristics ==
Compendiario works generally share several visual characteristics:

- a predominance of a white, opaque and often highly luminous tin glaze;
- a restricted palette, especially blue, yellow and orange;
- rapid, abbreviated and sketch-like brushwork;
- figures, putti, animals, landscapes or heraldic devices reduced to their essential forms;
- substantial areas of undecorated white ground;
- simple garlands, vegetal motifs or linear ornament used to frame or accompany the central image.

The decoration may be limited to the centre of a dish, bowl or other vessel, or distributed more widely across the surface. The deliberate relationship between painted motifs and the exposed white glaze is fundamental to the visual effect of the style.

Compendiario decoration could be applied to both functional tableware and ambitious luxury objects. The surviving corpus includes dishes, bowls, albarelli, ewers, chargers, coolers, bottles, plaques and architectural ceramics. The Museum of Ceramics in Faenza documents the use of the style on increasingly elaborate vessel forms and sumptuous table services.

The terminology should be used with some caution. "Compendiario" may describe a specific decorative language on white-ground maiolica, but art-historical catalogues do not always apply the term consistently, especially to transitional productions such as late figurative wares from Montelupo.

== Collections and museums ==
Examples of Italian maiolica described as compendiario or associated with the bianchi tradition are preserved in a number of public collections, including:

- Acquapendente, Museo della Città Civico e Diocesano, which displays ceramics including examples in the compendiario style.
- Deruta, Museo Regionale della Ceramica, including its section on 17th-century compendiario production.
- Faenza, Museo Internazionale delle Ceramiche in Faenza, whose Renaissance collections include the "whites of Faenza" and compendiario decoration.
- Florence, the museum at Torre della Pagliazza, which includes Renaissance and post-Renaissance ceramics from Montelupo and large compendiario dishes.
- Laterza, Museo della Maiolica di Laterza (MuMa), which preserves 16th-century objects described as being in the compendiario style.
- London, Victoria and Albert Museum, one of the world's major collections of Italian Renaissance maiolica.
- Loreto Aprutino, Museo Acerbo, whose collection of Castelli maiolica includes rare examples of compendiario objects.

== Gallery ==
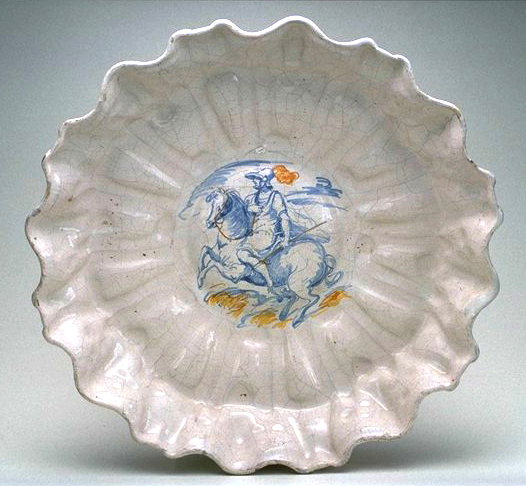
Crespina with a figure, Virgiliotto Calamelli, Faenza, 1560–1599

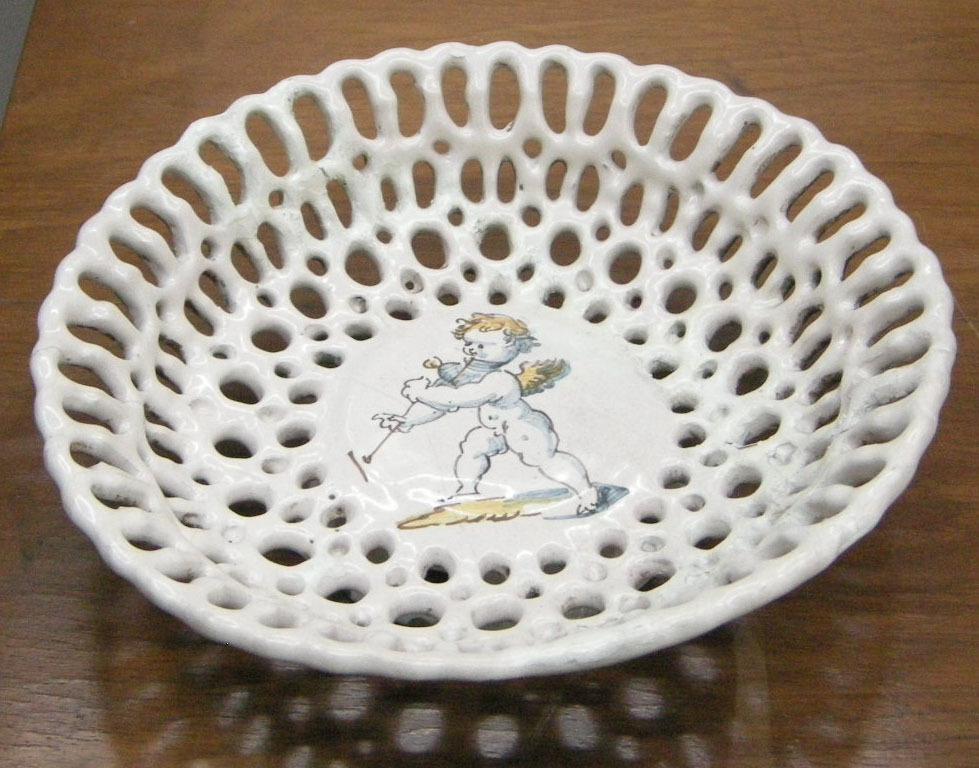
Pierced bowl, Faenza workshop, last quarter of the 16th century

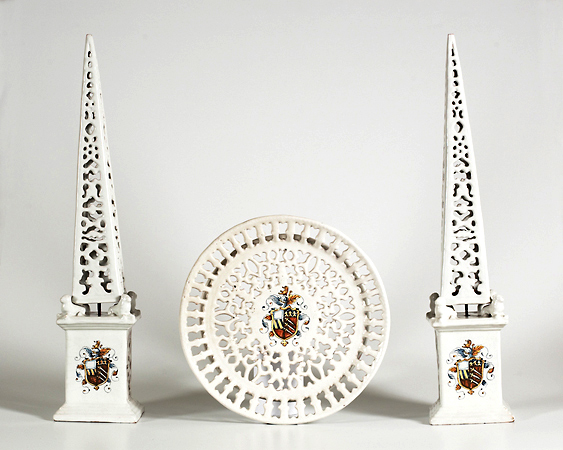
Openwork table centrepieces, Faenza, late 16th century

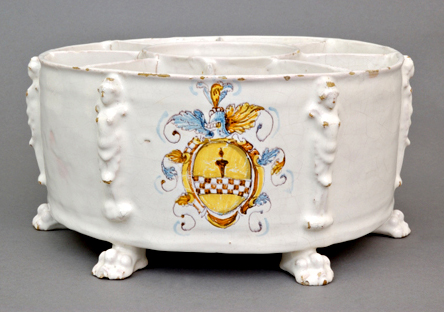
Rinfrescatoio with painted heraldic arms, Faenza, 17th century

Bottle in the compendiario style, Museo Castromediano, Lecce

Maiolica tiles in the compendiario style, Faenza, c. 1600–1650

Crespina, Montelupo, c. 1590–1610

Small dish with seated putto, berrettino glaze, Faenza, c. 1550–1600

Small dish with dancing putto, Faenza, c. 1550–1600

Pierced plate with the arms of the lords of Hohenems, Virgiliotto Calamelli, c. 1600

Pilgrim flask with Gonzaga–Habsburg arms, workshop of Leonardo Bettisi (Don Pino), c. 1582

Dish with a narrative scene and compendiario decoration, Leonardo Bettisi, 1576

Fragment of a dish in late compendiario style, central Italy, 17th–18th century

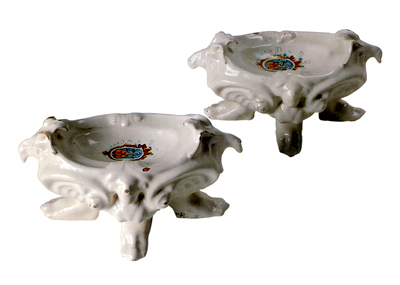
Pair of salt cellars, Faenza, 17th century

Presentation dish with Neptune and Amphitrite, Leonardo Bettisi, Faenza, c. 1550–1600

== Bibliography ==
- Ballardini, Gaetano (1929–30). "Un nuovo capitolo nella storia della maiolica italiana". Dedalo, 10, pp. 149–163.
- De Pompeis, Vincenzo, ed. (2010). La maiolica italiana di stile compendiario: I bianchi. Torino: Umberto Allemandi.
- Donatone, Guido (2016). La maiolica di Laterza del Seicento. Galatina: Congedo.
- Arbace, Luciana (2000). Francesco Grue, 1618–1673: La maiolica a Castelli d'Abruzzo dal compendiario all'istoriato. Colledara: Andromeda.
- Wilson, Timothy (2016). Maiolica: Italian Renaissance Ceramics in the Metropolitan Museum of Art. New York: The Metropolitan Museum of Art. ISBN 978-1-58839-561-0.
- Sani, Elisa; Liefkes, Reino; Mallet, John (2007). Italian Renaissance Maiolica. London: V&A Publications. ISBN 978-1-85177-706-8.
- Piccolpasso, Cipriano (c. 1557). Li tre libri dell'arte del vasaio (The Three Books of the Potter's Art).

== See also ==
- Maiolica
- Faenza ceramics
- Italian Renaissance
- Hellenistic art
- Roman painting
- Istoriato
- Deruta
- Laterza
- Castelli
