= Francesco Antonio Xaverio Grue =

Italian potter and painter (1686–1746)

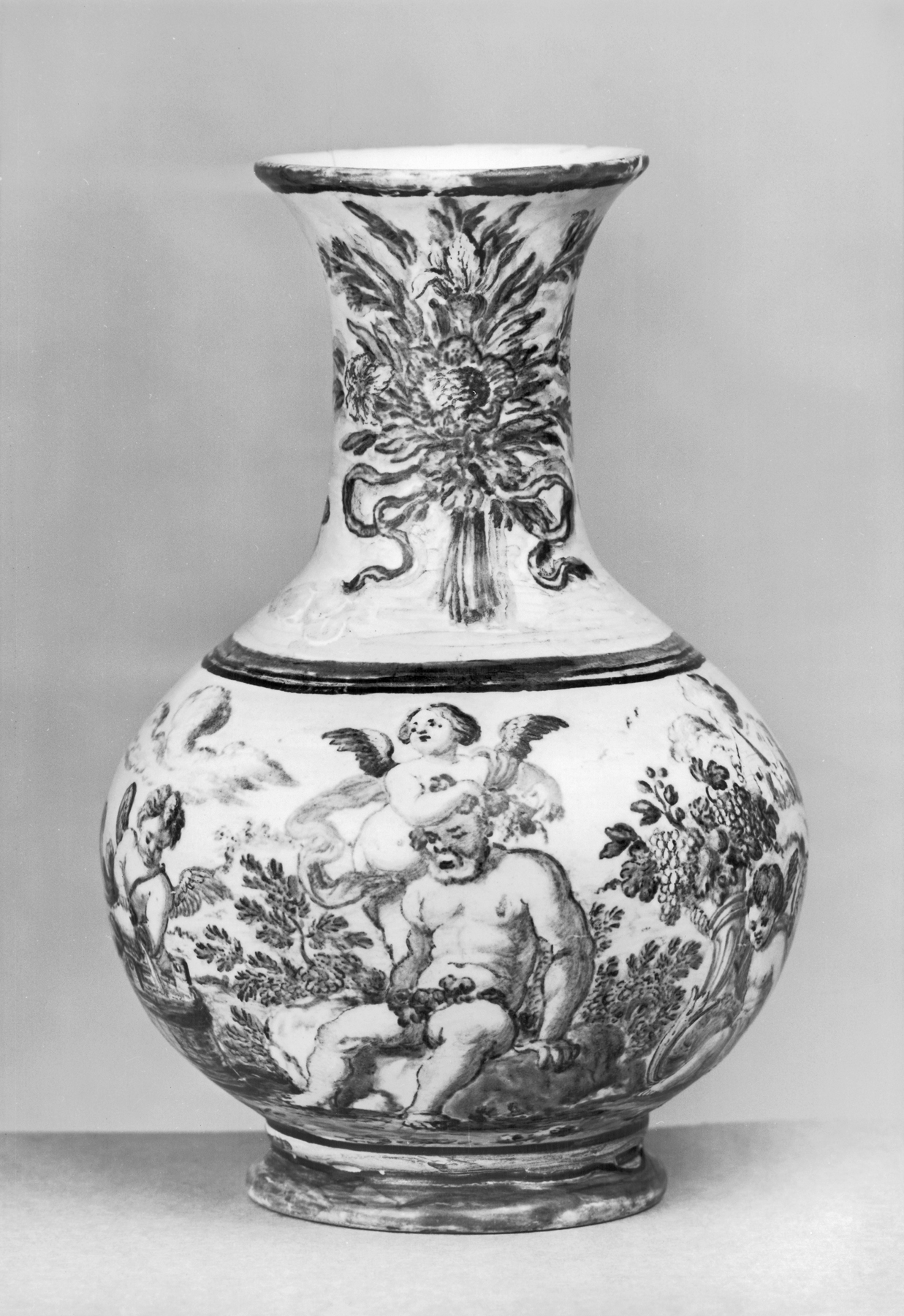
Small Urn with Silenus by Francesco Antonio Xaverio Grue, Walters Art Museum, 1720

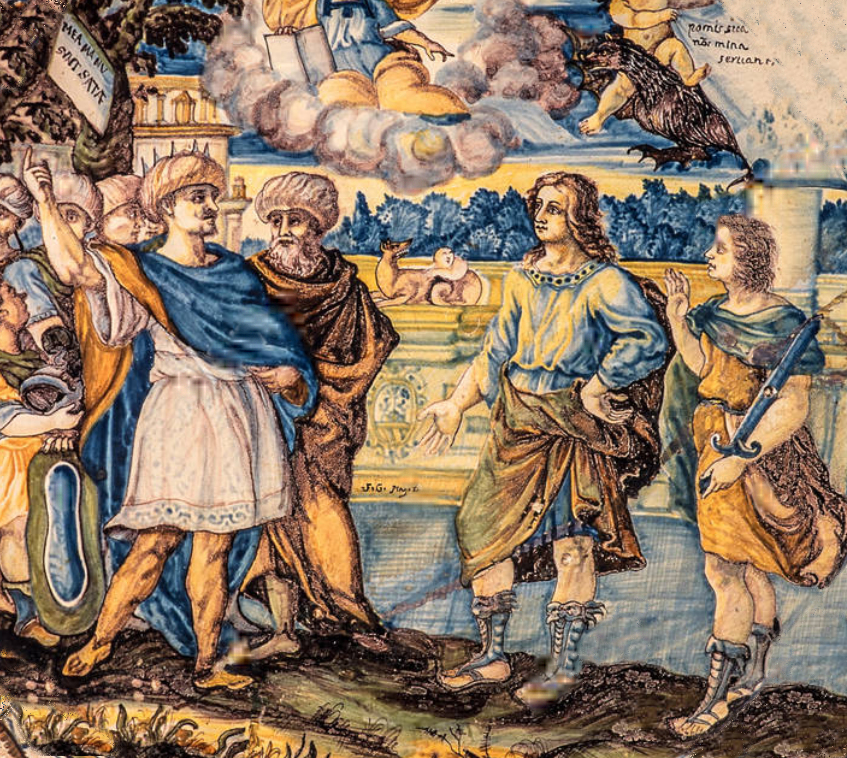
Meeting between Cyrus the Younger and Spartan general Lysander in Sardis. The encounter was related by Xenophon. Maiolica decoration by Francesco Antonio Grue.

Francesco Antonio Xaverio Grue (1686–1746) was an Italian potter and painter.

== Biography ==
Grue was born in Castelli, Abruzzo, into a family of maiolica potters and painters. His grandfather was Francesco Grue and his father was Carlo Antonio, who was also a potter. In Naples, Grue produced many ceramic works, especially plates decorated with landscapes or putti in the center, and tendril or festoon borders. Wares were also often signed and dated. In 1736 he returned to his hometown and continued to work until his death in 1746.

Initially sent to the Seminary of Penne, Abruzzo to become a priest, but uninterested in liturgy, he became interested in literature. He left to study medicine in Teramo, civil law in Naples, and canon law in Rome. Despite all this training, he gravitated to the arts, and studied in Penne with Giovanni Lavalle. After a stint in Urbino, he developed a focus on decorating ceramics. His depicted genre or Bamboccianti themes. Grue headed a tax revolt that broke out in Castelli, Abruzzo in 1716 against the Marchese Francesco Paolo Mendoza when he imposed a tax on the clay used to make majolica. He was jailed for a number of years in Naples, but emerged, and is responsible for painting some of the ceramics at pharmacy of the Ospedale degli Incurabili, Naples. The ceramics depicted the illnesses treated by the contents of the ceramic jars.
