= Giacomo Mancini (ceramicist) =

Giacomo Mancini was an Italian ceramicist (died circa 1581). He is best known for the painted maiolica works that came from his workshop in Deruta, Umbria, Italy. He is also known as "El Frate" (the Friar).

== Biography ==
There is some uncertainty about the earliest years of Mancini's activity. By 1490 Deruta's workshops were producing figural and narrative istoriato ware. Dishes have been attributed to Mancini and his workshop as early as the 1520s.

From 1525 onward Giacomo Mancini is documented as leading a prominent workshop with his sons Filippo and Africano.

Mancini was active in the middle decades of the sixteenth century. Several dishes survive that were signed by him in the 1540s.

Many examples of painted tin-glazed ceramics survive in museums that are attributed to Mancini and his workshop. Mancini's workshop produced a variety of types of ceramics, including plates with armorial devices or istoriato, and plaques with pastoral scenes or Christian devotional scenes.

Plate with a coat of arms surrounded by grotesques (1550), Mancini workshop, Deruta, Italy. Photo by Sailko.

== Works ==
The Fitzwilliam Museum, University of Cambridge, holds The Crucifixion (1556, MAR.C.57-1912), which is an example of a detailed polychrome panel that shows Mancini's skill with crowded historical scenes. It is also likely that the composition of this panel was inspired by two prints created by followers of Marcantonio Raimondi and Francesco Salviati (1541).

Dish with couple in a landscape, Attributed to the workshop of Giacomo Mancini, ca. 1520–1550. Tin-glazed earthenware (maiolica). Gardiner Museum, Toronto, Canada. Gift of George and Helen Gardiner.

Mancini's workshop also produced lustred maiolica, which involved applying metallic oxides in order to produce an iridescent shine after firing a third time in a kiln. Lustreware was particularly expensive, mimicked even more expensive metallic plates, and was found in wealthy domestic settings. The Metropolitan Museum of Art holds an example of domestic lustreware: Dish with two lovers (circa 1520-1550, 84.2.11).

Mancini's workshop was known for its high technical ability and produced display pieces or "piatto di pompe" (ceremonial dish) for wealthy clients. These dishes tend to be 38-44 cm in diameter and were popular from 1500 to 1560. One example is the Walters Art Museum's Dish with Constantine the Great (1540-1560). Another example is the Gardiner Museum's Dish with couple in a landscape (ca. 1520-1550), which measures at 7.7 x 40.6 cm.

== Gallery ==
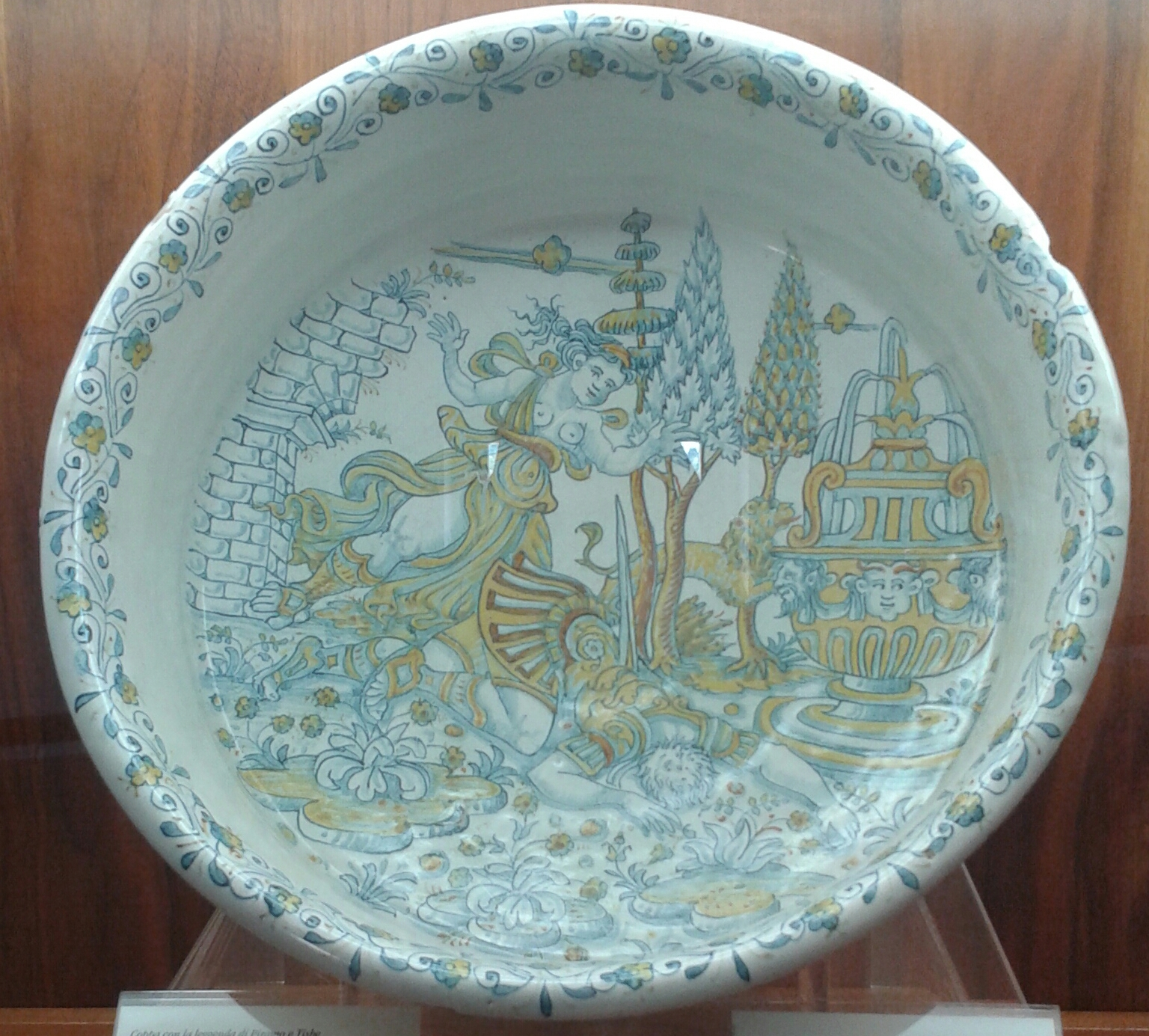
Workshop of Giacomo Mancini, Dish with a scene of Pyramus and Thisby.

Workshop of Giacomo Mancini, Dish with a bust of a woman.
