= Faenza ceramics =

Ceramic production and art of Faenza, Italy

Ceramica di Faenza
- Faenza ceramics
- Faience
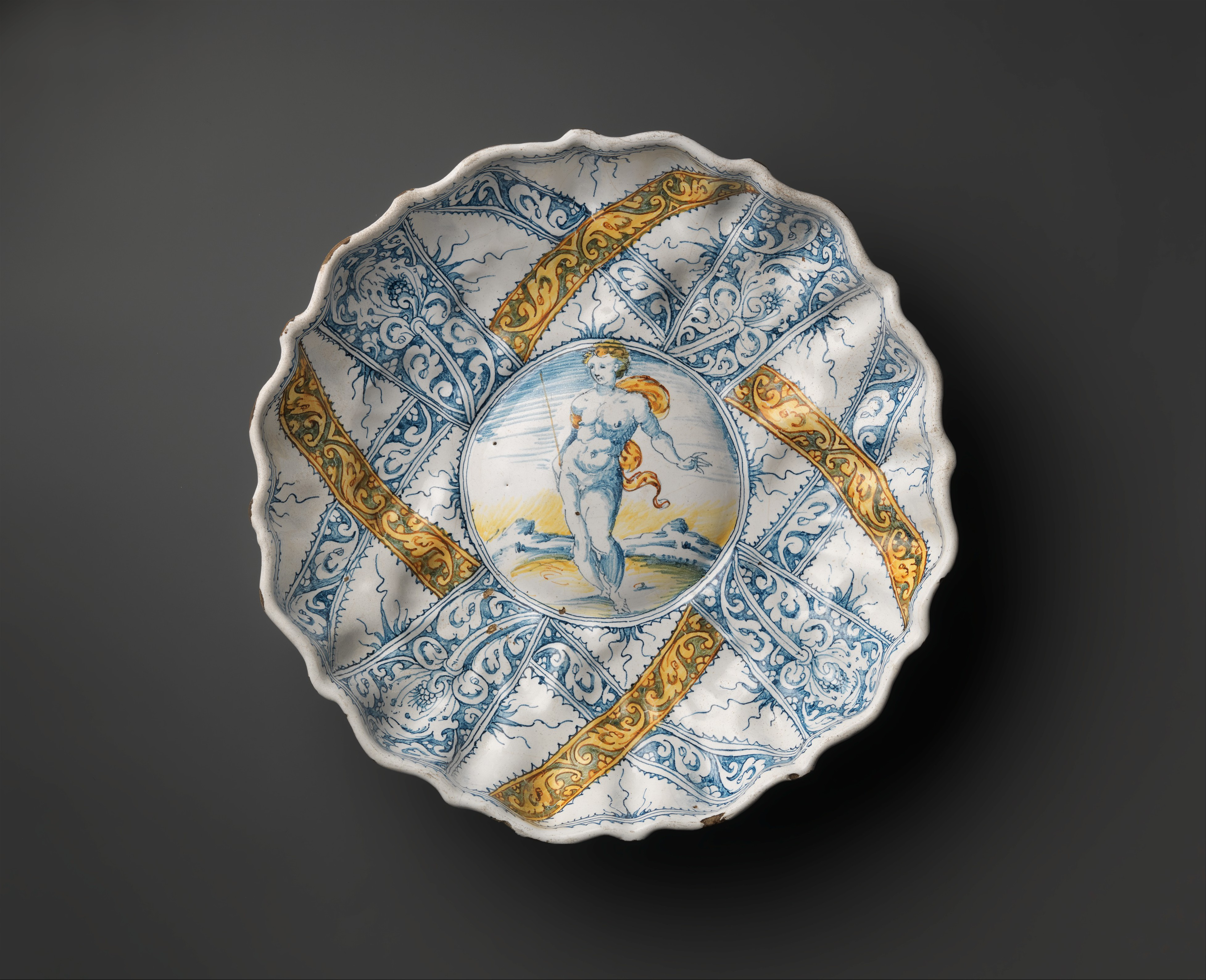
- Bowl in "Faenza white" style, Leonardo Bettisi, circa 1570–1580, Metropolitan Museum of Art
- Type: maiolica
- Field: art, handicraft, design
- Nature: identity-based
- Character: traditional, experimental
- Municipality: Faenza
- Country: Italy

Faenza ceramics (ceramica di Faenza) refers to the artistic and craft tradition of ceramics that developed in the city of Faenza, in Emilia-Romagna. Faenza production, which became particularly established between the Renaissance and the early modern period, consists predominantly of decorated maiolica, characterized by the use of glazes and painted decoration, with repertoires including Renaissance, naturalistic, figurative, heraldic, and geometric motifs.

The renown achieved by Faenza's ceramic production between the 16th and 17th centuries contributed to its international reputation; the name of the city is in fact the origin of the term faïence, used in several languages to refer to glazed ceramics. The production tradition, which developed through workshops and studios and continued into the contemporary era, contributed to the formation of a distinct local ceramic identity. Faenza's production is today recognized within the field of artistic and traditional ceramics and is protected as a designation of origin.

Faenza's ceramic sector combines craft practices with artistic research, design and innovation, supported by a network of institutions, events and international cooperation initiatives; these characteristics were among the factors considered in Faenza's designation, in 2025, as a UNESCO Creative City in the Crafts and Folk Art category.

== History ==
=== Antiquity and Middle Ages: the origins ===
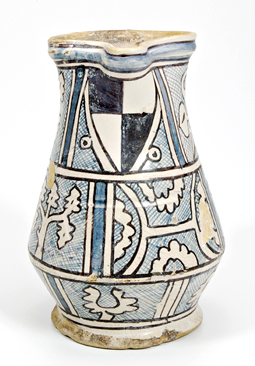
Jug with the coat of arms of the Manfredi family, late 14th century

The ceramic tradition of Faenza has its roots in antiquity, with evidence of production activities already in Roman times, favored by the availability of suitable clays along the course of the Lamone River. However, it was in the Late Middle Ages that the city began to stand out as a major ceramic center.

Thanks to the nature of the territory, rich in clays suitable for shaping, and to its strategic geographical position, a meeting point between Padan and Tuscan culture, Faenza consolidated itself as an important artisanal hub already in the centuries following the year 1000. During this period, numerous workshops developed, producing artifacts mainly intended for domestic and liturgical use, characterized by simple yet functional forms.

Faenza potters, over these centuries, perfected two important technical processes for coating artifacts: glazing and slip coating, which allowed for more impermeable and decorative surfaces. At the same time, techniques of glazing spread, representing the intermediate step between ancient coarse ceramics and the more evolved Renaissance maiolica. Stylistically, medieval ornaments recall the decorative repertoires of applied arts such as manuscript illumination and textiles, revealing Byzantine and Islamic influences. The most recurring motifs are vegetal – vines with leaves or stylized floral elements – and zoomorphic, with figures of fish and birds sometimes reinterpreted in a fantastic key. Heraldic emblems are also present, often linked to noble families that marked the city's history, testifying to the growing prestige of Faenza ceramics in the social sphere as well.

This complex interplay of technical innovation and stylistic contaminations meant that, by the end of the Middle Ages, Faenza had already distinguished itself as one of the main ceramic production centers of Northern Italy. This dynamic laid the foundations for the extraordinary artistic flourishing that, in the 15th century, would lead the city to its definitive affirmation in the panorama of Renaissance maiolica.

=== Renaissance: the golden age ===
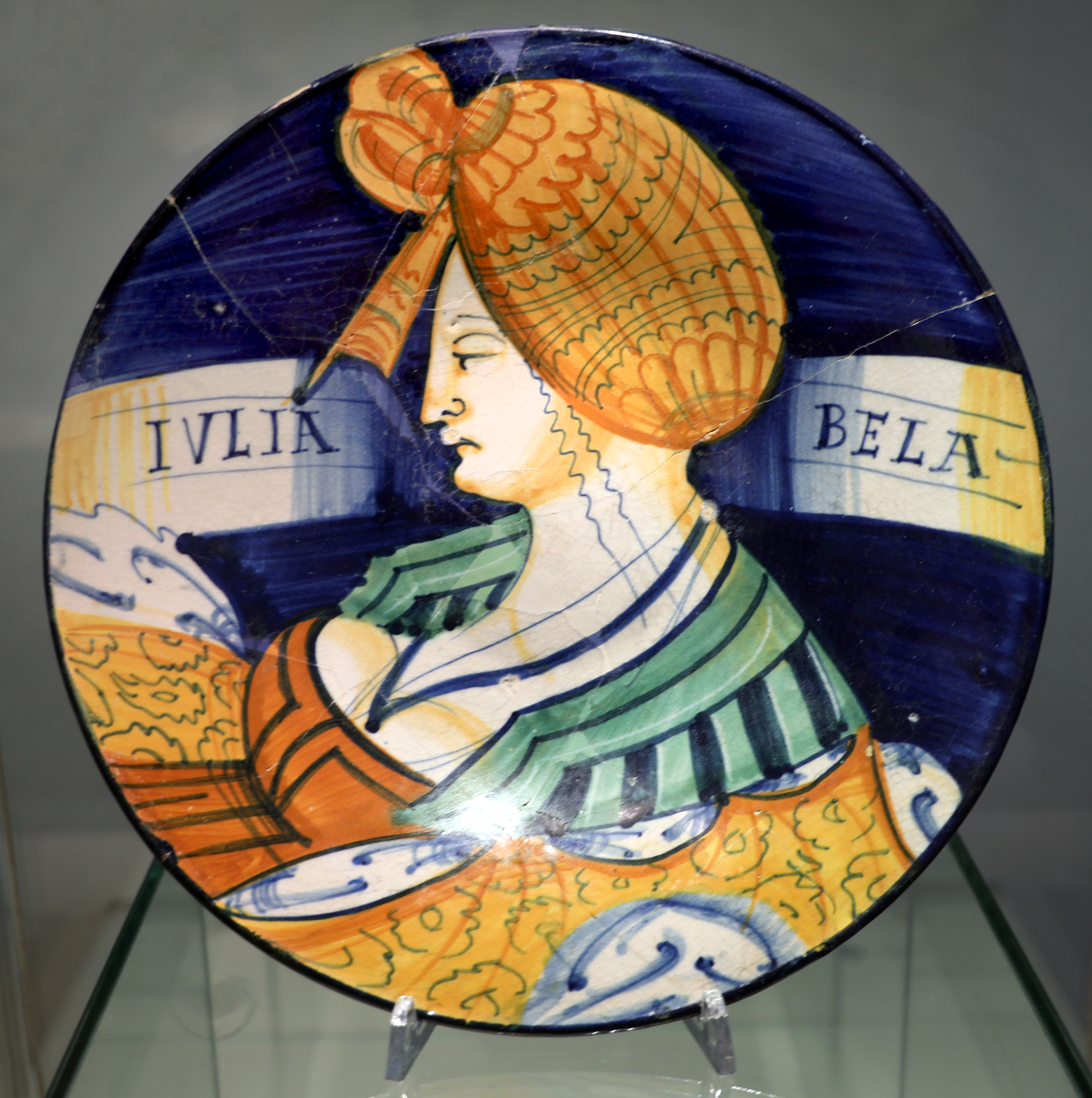
Plate with female portrait "Giulia Bella", circa 1490–1510, International Museum of Ceramics

In the Renaissance, ceramics assumed a preeminent role in the artisanal and artistic life of Faenza. From the early decades of the 15th century, the production of tableware evolved and refined, also taking on ornamental functions, as in the case of “display plates”. Having abandoned sgraffito ceramics, artisans specialized in glazed ceramics, maiolica, expanding the chromatic palette with new tones such as yellow and turchino.

The production of the early Renaissance, still in a severe style, is divided into two main phases: in the initial phase (1420–1460 approx.) the two decorative families of Zaffera and Italo-Moresque prevailed, with motifs inspired by oriental suggestions; in the second phase (1460–end of the century) Gothic-style decorations became dominant, such as the peacock feather eye and the Persian palmette.

In the 16th century, production reached its peak for decorative richness and variety of Renaissance motifs: grotesques, garlands, trophies, musical instruments, flowers and fruit, wreaths and vegetal interlacings. Within these declinations, the istoriato style also emerged, characterized by a narrative component with complex biblical and mythological episodes.

After 1550, decoration favored the floral style, celebrating maximum figurative exuberance, but a need for greater sobriety was already felt. Thus was born the compendiario style, where scenes were sketched with light strokes and few colors (turchino, light and dark yellow) on a dense, pasty white glaze. From this search for essentiality arose, in the following century, the fortune of the famous "Bianchi di Faenza” (Faenza whites), whose monochrome elegance became a model imitated throughout Europe.

Among the protagonists of this artistic season were several workshops and masters who contributed to the evolution of decorative languages:

- Ca' Pirota – workshop run by the Pirotti family, active between the late 15th and 16th centuries, whose production contributed to defining the formal and decorative models later adopted in local manufactories.
- Virgiliotto Calamelli – a key figure in the development of the compendiario, characterized by synthetic, rapid decorations with strong chromatic impact; in collaboration with Pier Agostino Valladori, he also worked in the areas of Bologna and Ferrara.
- Leonardo Bettisi – known as Don Pino, one of the most important figures of the compendiario.
- Dalle Palle (or Giangrandi) – family of ceramists particularly active in the production of the "Faenza whites".
- Baldassarre Manara – active in the first half of the 16th century; his istoriato maiolica represents one of the most accomplished expressions of Renaissance Faenza ceramics. The plate Tereus, Procne and Philomela of 1532 is attributed to him.
- Pietro Bergantini – together with his brother Paolo, he ran a workshop producing maiolica with berettino style (blue-grey) ground and polychrome decorations. His works are notable for their precision and for the systematic use of signatures and dates, which facilitate the reconstruction of his activity.

=== Modern Age: the Ferniani factory ===
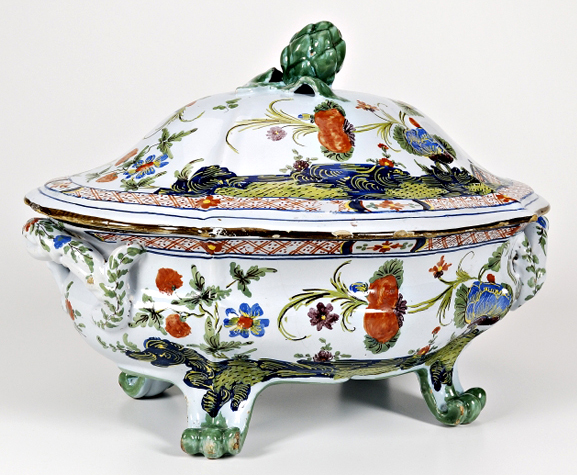
Soup tureen with "garofano" decoration, Ferniani manufactory, circa 1780, International Museum of Ceramics in Faenza

The 17th century represented for Faenza ceramics a period of transformation and gradual renewal. After the Renaissance splendour and a subsequent slowdown, local production shifted towards more sober forms, inspired by Baroque and Neoclassical taste, without losing its decorative identity. Workshops created shaped table services, modelled plastic applications and commissioned decorations for aristocratic patrons, marking an evolution towards refinement and personalization.

The Age of Enlightenment began in Faenza with a revival of ceramic tradition after the decline of the late 17th century. In 1693, Count Annibale Carlo Ferniani took over an old city factory, founding the Ferniani Factory, which soon became the new centre of Faenza ceramic art. The workshop stood out for adopting decorative tastes influenced by European fashions, particularly French, and exotic suggestions from the Orient, such as chinoiserie. Its production imposed itself for quality and originality, restoring Faenza's name to the top of European ceramics.

The task of 18th-century maiolica was also to counter the growing competition of porcelain, whose formula had finally been discovered in Europe after centuries of imitations of Far Eastern wares. Porcelain triumphed in the 18th century: compared to maiolica, it was more ductile, compact and resistant, while remaining light, and allowed the creation of thin objects with very fine decoration.

In Italy, porcelain supremacy was effectively countered by manufactories in Turin, Milan, Lodi, Faenza, Bologna, Venice, Bassano, Pesaro, Castelli d’Abruzzo and Cerreto Sannita. In Faenza, the Ferniani factory proved particularly up-to-date, introducing important technological and stylistic innovations; it adopted the third firing “a piccolo fuoco”, which allowed a wider range of colours and more delicate decorations, and experimented with terraglia, a recent English discovery, alongside traditional maiolica.

With the advent of the 19th century and industrialization, many historic workshops reduced or ceased artisanal production. However, other enterprises and schools continued to cultivate ceramic art, keeping Faenza's artistic vocation alive and preparing the ground for the experiences of the 19th and 20th centuries.

In this context stands the figure of Achille Farina, a painter and ceramist who, after collaborating with the Ferniani factory, founded his own kiln and introduced a personal slip-painting technique capable of imitating oil-painting effects on maiolica.

=== Contemporary Age: innovation ===
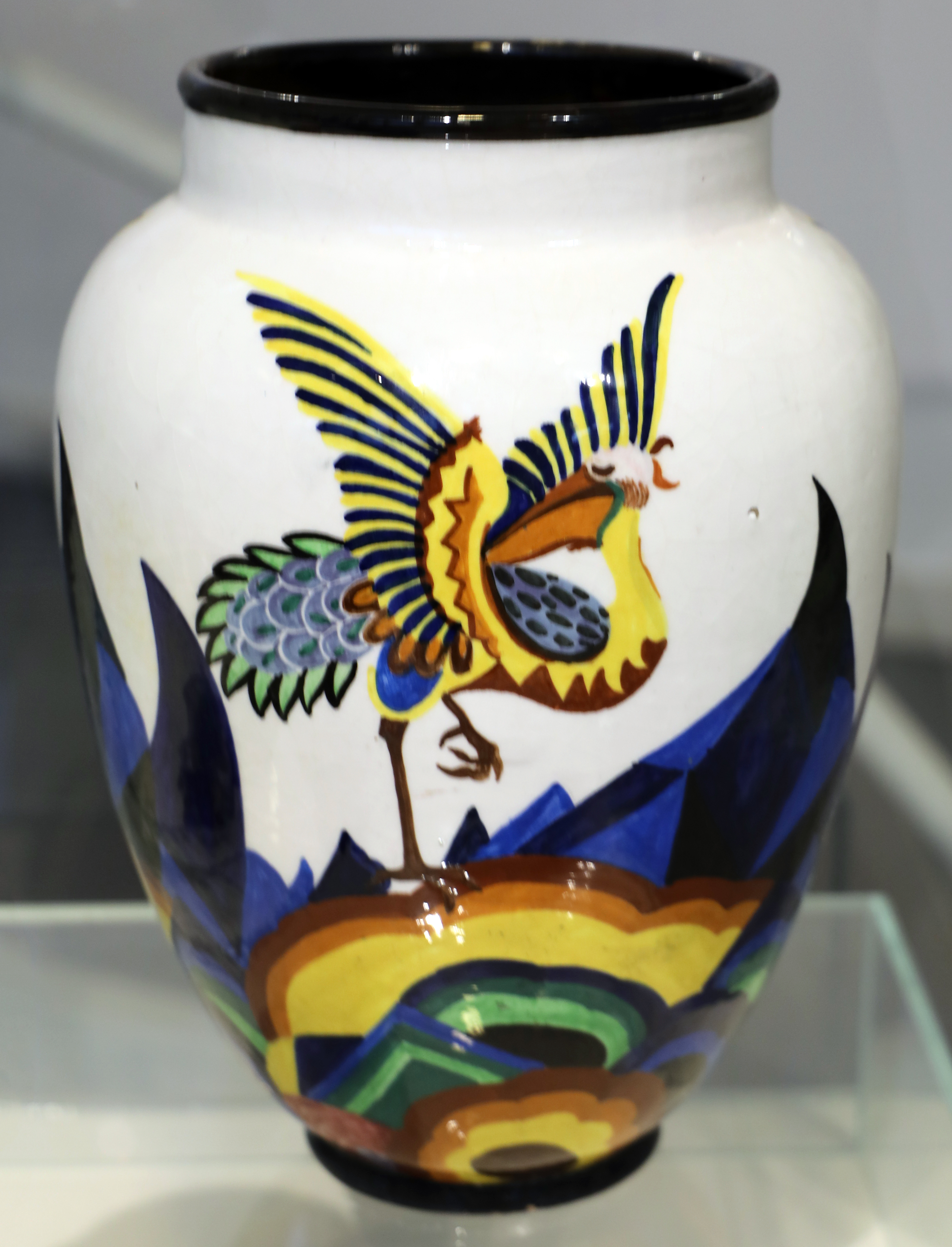
Vase with storks, Riccardo Gatti, 1928–1929, International Museum of Ceramics in Faenza

During the 20th century, Faenza became an international reference centre for art ceramics. In the early years of the century, around Domenico Baccarini, a lively circle of artists and intellectuals formed – including Francesco Nonni, Pietro Melandri and Riccardo Gatti – who renewed the figurative and decorative language of Faenza ceramics, paving the way for later experimentation.

In 1908, thanks to the initiative of Gaetano Ballardini and the support of Tito Pasqui, the International Museum of Ceramics in Faenza (MIC) was founded, one of the world's leading museums dedicated to ceramics, with a collection including both historical and contemporary works. The MIC has played a fundamental role in the conservation, study and promotion of Faenza ceramic production.

In 1916, Ballardini also founded the State Institute of Art for Ceramics, later named after him.

From the post-World War II period onwards, Faenza expanded its educational offer with university courses and exhibitions dedicated to contemporary design. These initiatives fostered technical and artistic innovation, consolidating the link between artisanal tradition and modern... consolidating the link between artisanal tradition and modern experimentation.

Today the city hosts major international events, including the Faenza Prize – International Biennial of Contemporary Ceramic Art, which selects and awards significant works in the field of contemporary artistic ceramics, confirming the city as a recognized centre of production, research and experimentation.

==== Masters of the 20th century ====
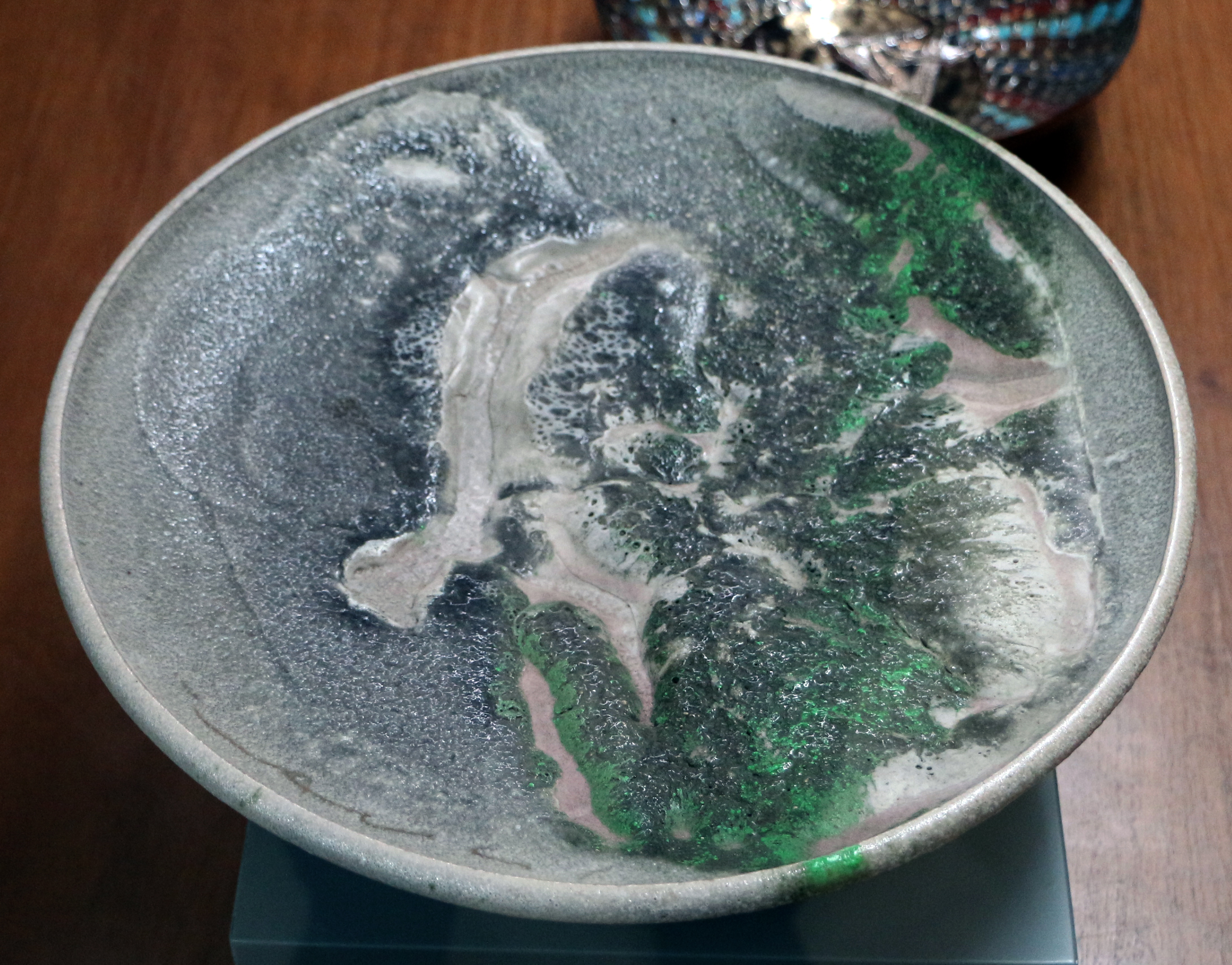
Textured plate, Carlo Zauli, circa 1980

From the first half of the 20th century onwards, Faenza ceramics opened up to modern languages, influenced by the Modern Movement and Informal art. Several figures marked the transition between tradition and contemporaneity.

Among the main Faenza masters of the 20th century are:

- Achille Calzi (1873–1919) – painter and ceramist, a key figure in the artistic and cultural panorama of early 20th-century Faenza; director of the Fabbriche Riunite di Ceramica, he contributed to the stylistic and technical renewal of Faenza ceramics.
- Pietro Melandri (1885–1976) – ceramist, painter and decorator, among the protagonists of the renewal of Faenza ceramics; he experimented with glazes and lustres, distinguishing himself for the purity of forms and chromatic harmony of his works.
- Francesco Nonni (1885–1976) – engraver, painter and ceramist, known for refined woodcuts and for ceramic production in Art Deco style, contributing to the dialogue between applied and figurative arts.
- Riccardo Gatti (1886–1972) – ceramist and sculptor, innovator in glazing and Futurist decoration of Faenza ceramics.
- Anselmo Bucci (1887–1959) – artisan-ceramist and experimenter, pupil of Virginio Minardi; he promoted studio-atelier ceramics, focusing on lustred maiolica and refined glazes.
- Gianna Boschi (1913–1986) – painter and ceramist, she transferred her pictorial poetics into ceramics; works of refined elegance, figures suspended between reality and symbol.
- Domenico Matteucci (1914–1991) – known primarily as a ceramic artist, he was also a draftsman and painter of multifaceted character.
- Guerrino Tramonti (1915–1992) – artist and sculptor ceramist, known for chromatic research and technical experimentation.
- Leandro Lega (1924–2002) – ceramist and sculptor, known for large plastic compositions and expressive use of colour.
- Carlo Zauli (1926–2002) – ceramist and sculptor, considered by international critics one of the greatest renovators of ceramic art.
- Ivo Sassi (1937–2020) – sculptor ceramist, pioneer in the use of maiolica for abstract forms and large-scale installations.
- Goffredo Gaeta (1937–2022) – artist and theorist of ceramics, author of monumental works and important critical studies on Faenza culture.
- Alfonso Leoni (1941–1980) – radical innovator of contemporary ceramics, he introduced concepts of deconstructed sculpture, ceramic collage and performance, overcoming the limits of traditional language.
- Guido Mariani (1950–2021) – sculptor and ceramist, he introduced a groundbreaking artistic language in the history of conceptual art in Faenza.

These authors contributed to the renewal of ceramic language, participating in international exhibitions and the Venice Biennale.

==== Contemporary ceramists ====
In Faenza, the ceramic tradition not only continues but is renewed through authors working between art, design and craftsmanship, reinterpreting classical techniques of maiolica and terraglia in a contemporary key. Numerous Faenza ceramists have gained national and international visibility, participating in exhibitions, artist residencies and collaborations with European institutions.

== Techniques and materials ==
Faenza maiolica, also known as faenza smaltata, is a type of ceramic characterized by a glassy coating opacified with tin oxide, which gives the artifact a white and brilliant appearance, ideal as a base for painted decoration.

Production is based on a mixture of local clay, rich in iron oxides and easily workable. After a first firing at about 950 °C (biscottatura), the artifact is coated with an opaque white tin glaze, which serves as a base for painted decoration. Colours, based on metal oxides, are applied on the raw glaze and fixed with a second firing at about 940–980 °C.

The most characteristic tones are cobalt blue, antimonial yellow, copper green and manganese brown. Faenza masters developed in the 16th century a remarkable mastery in the superimposition of colours and in the rendering of details, creating complex and precise decorations even on curved surfaces, such as albarelli (apothecary jars) and display plates.

The technique of Faenza maiolica, handed down from the Renaissance to the present day, is articulated in phases that have remained almost unchanged over the centuries:

1. shaping the clay form and first firing (biscotto);
2. application of the tin glaze by dipping or sprinkling;
3. preparation of the drawing through spolvero, which allows precise transfer of decorative motifs;
4. brush decoration with mineral oxides, which sometimes change tone after firing (for example “Blu Faenza”, which turns from violet to deep blue);
5. application of cristallina, a transparent glaze sprayed on the decorated object;
6. second firing at high temperature, about 930–980 °C, with very slow heating and cooling (12 hours per phase), which gives brilliance and durability to the artifact.

== Decorations and styles ==
The archaic period, between the 13th century and the early decades of the 15th, was characterized by production mainly intended for domestic and artisanal use: jugs, pitchers, bowls, plates, soup bowls and spice containers. Decorations were simple and recurring, with geometric, phytomorphic, zoomorphic, epigraphic and heraldic motifs. The most common colours were green, brown and turchino, applied on a white glazed background or with the reserve technique on a crosshatch ground. Alongside the more precious and expensive glazed production, there developed slipped ware, coated with a whitish or yellowish layer, intended for wider consumption and used especially for open forms such as plates and bowls. Another variant was glazed faenza, obtained with red clay covered by a transparent glaze that made it waterproof, used for table and kitchen ware.

Among the best-known decorative motifs are the so-called Bianchi di Faenza, characterized by a white glazed background with motifs of trophies, palmettes, garlands and grotesques painted in blue, yellow and orange. In the Renaissance period, the istoriato style also flourished, inspired by Renaissance painting and graphic models spread by artists such as Marcantonio Raimondi.

During the 17th and 18th centuries, Baroque floral motifs and Neoclassical ornamentations appeared, often enriched with gilding or turquoise and green glazes.

In modern times, Faenza artists have reinterpreted traditional themes with contemporary languages, blending elements of the Bauhaus and Italian design with local tradition.

The ceramic tradition, developed over the centuries, gave rise to numerous recognized and catalogued decorative styles. The main ones include:

- Garofano – introduced in the 18th century, featuring a stylized carnation at the centre of the plate, often on a white background with green, blue and red decorations.
- Penna di Pavone – characterized by fan-shaped motifs reminiscent of peacock feathers, with vivid colours and decorative symmetries.
- Berettino – monochrome blue decoration on a bluish background, often with floral and geometric motifs. Popular in the 16th century, it takes its name from the colour similar to the “berettino” fabric.
- Compendiario (Bianchi di Faenza - Faenza whites) – born in the 16th century, distinguished by graphic synthesis and rapid execution; decorations are essential, often monochrome, with light brushstrokes in turchino, yellow and sometimes orange, on a dense white glaze.
- Istoriato – narrative style inspired by Renaissance painting, with complex biblical and mythological episodes, often derived from engravings by artists such as Marcantonio Raimondi.
- Fiorito – developed after 1550, characterized by exuberant floral motifs, garlands, fruits and vegetal interlacings.
- Baroque and Neoclassical motifs – 17th–18th centuries, with floral decorations, gilding, turquoise and green enamels, and ornamental patterns inspired by European fashions.
- Modern reinterpretations – 20th–21st centuries, where traditional Faenza motifs are reworked with influences from the Bauhaus, Italian design and contemporary art.

=== Gallery of images ===
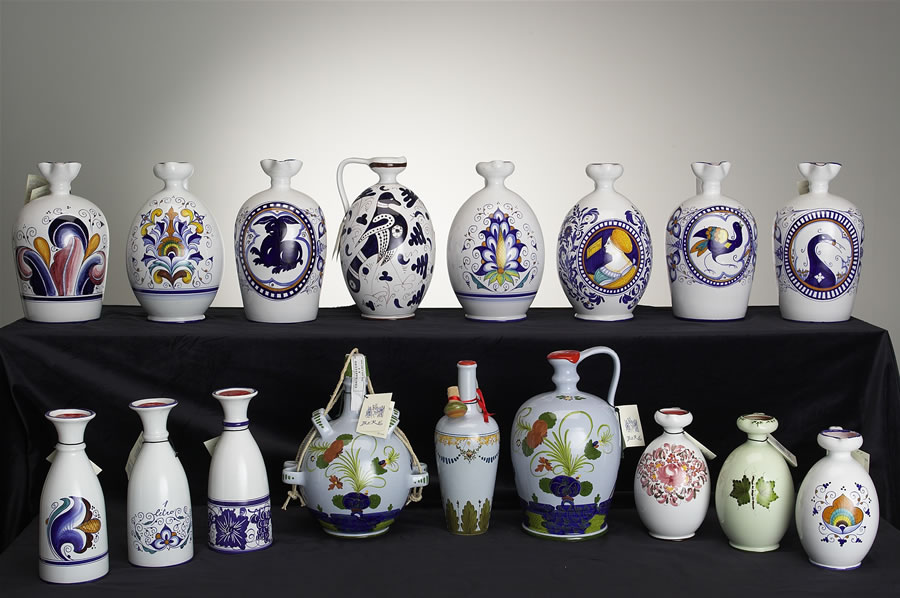
Flasks of Faenza ceramics in various decorative styles

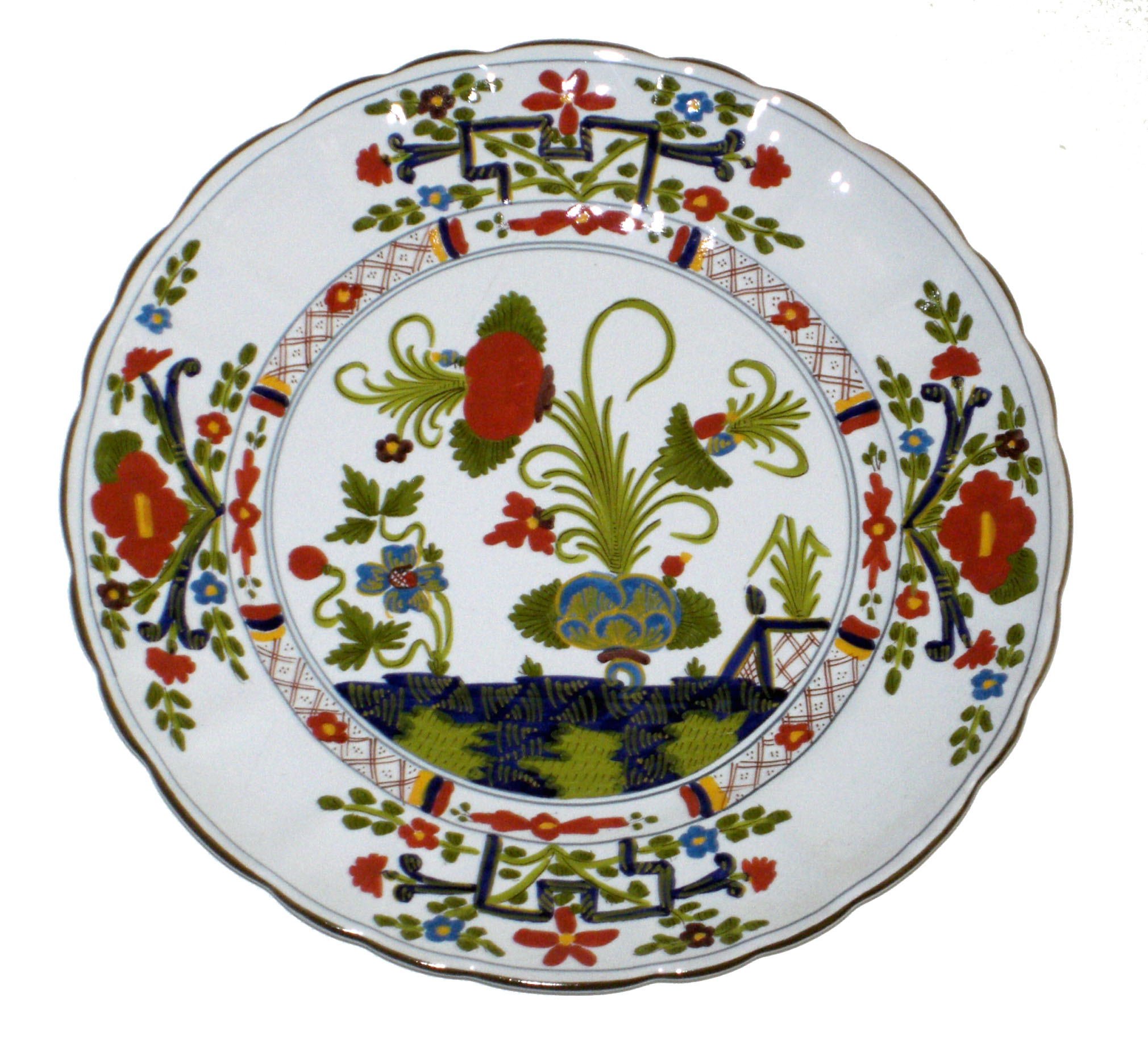
Plate decorated in the "Garofano" style

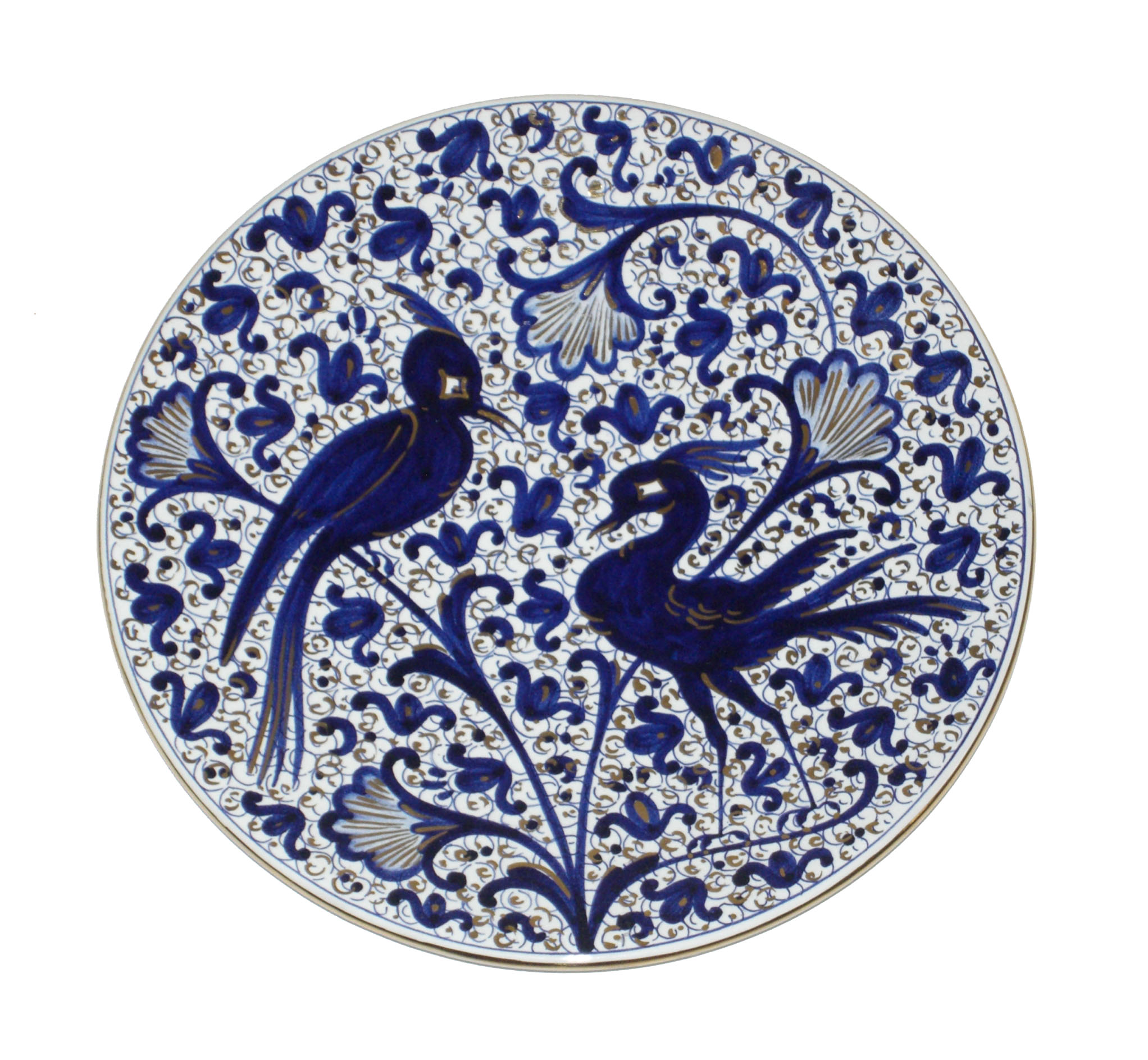
Plate decorated in the "Melograno" style

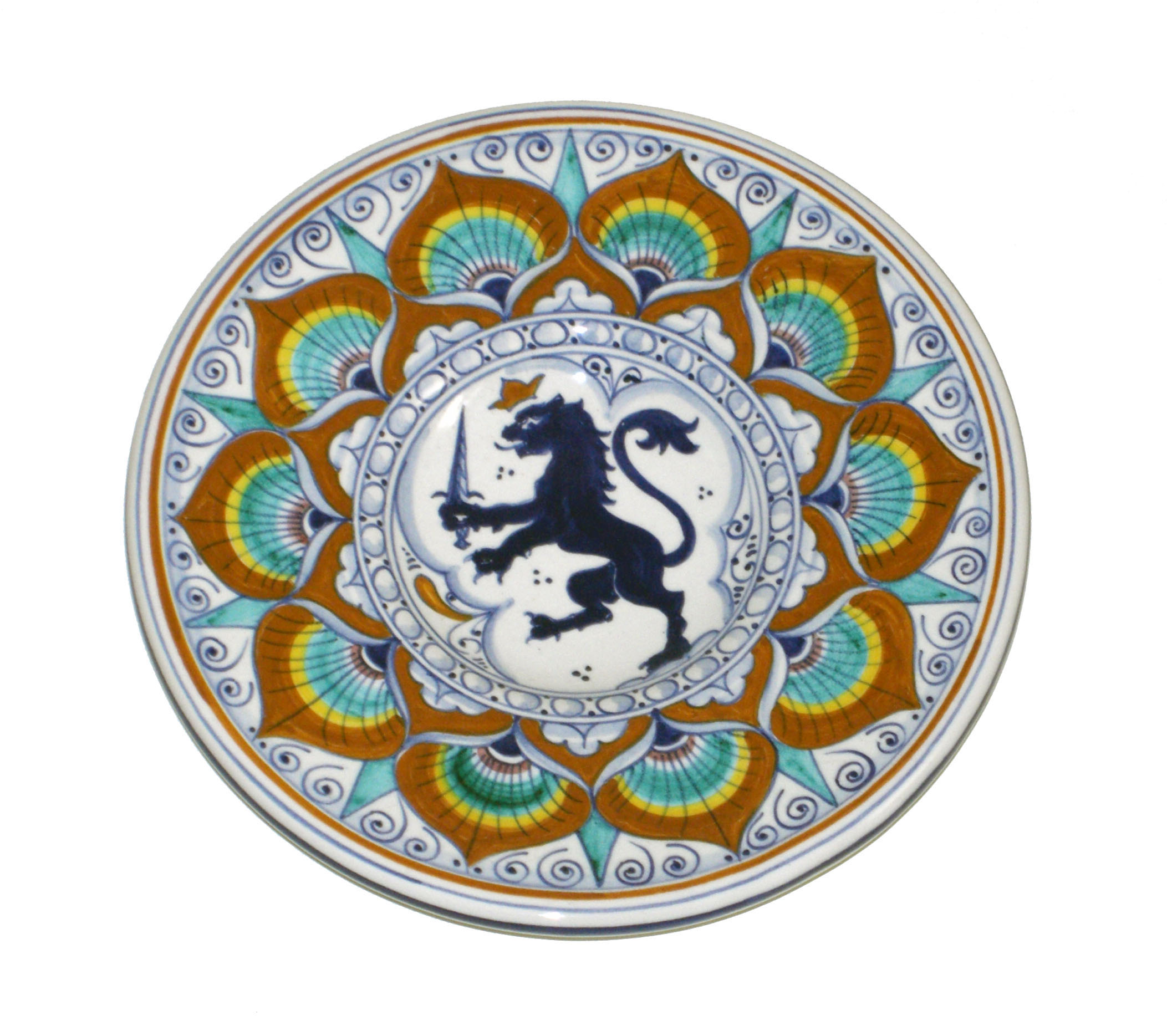
Plate decorated in the "Penna di Pavone" style

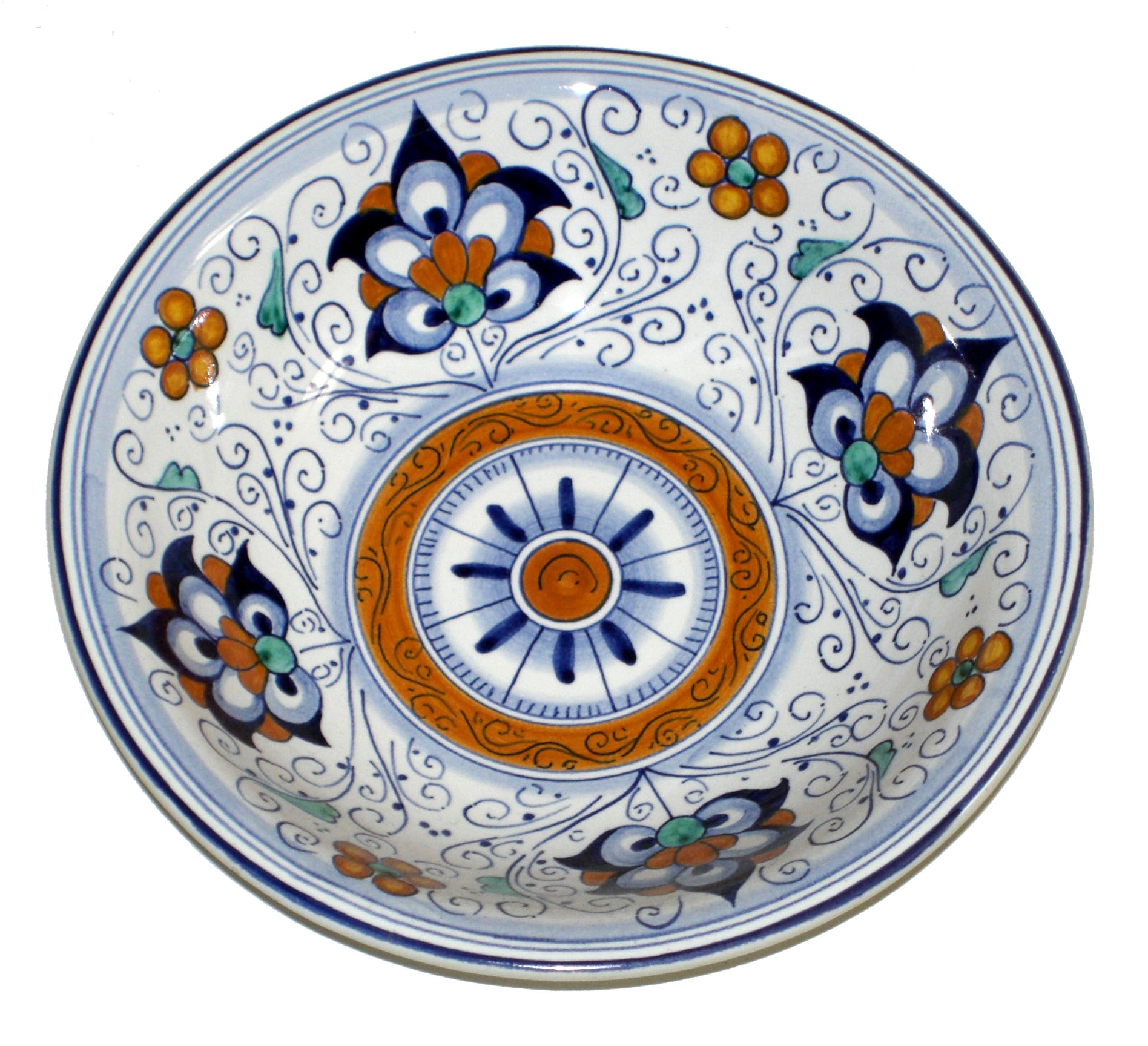
Plate with "Palmetta Persiana" motif

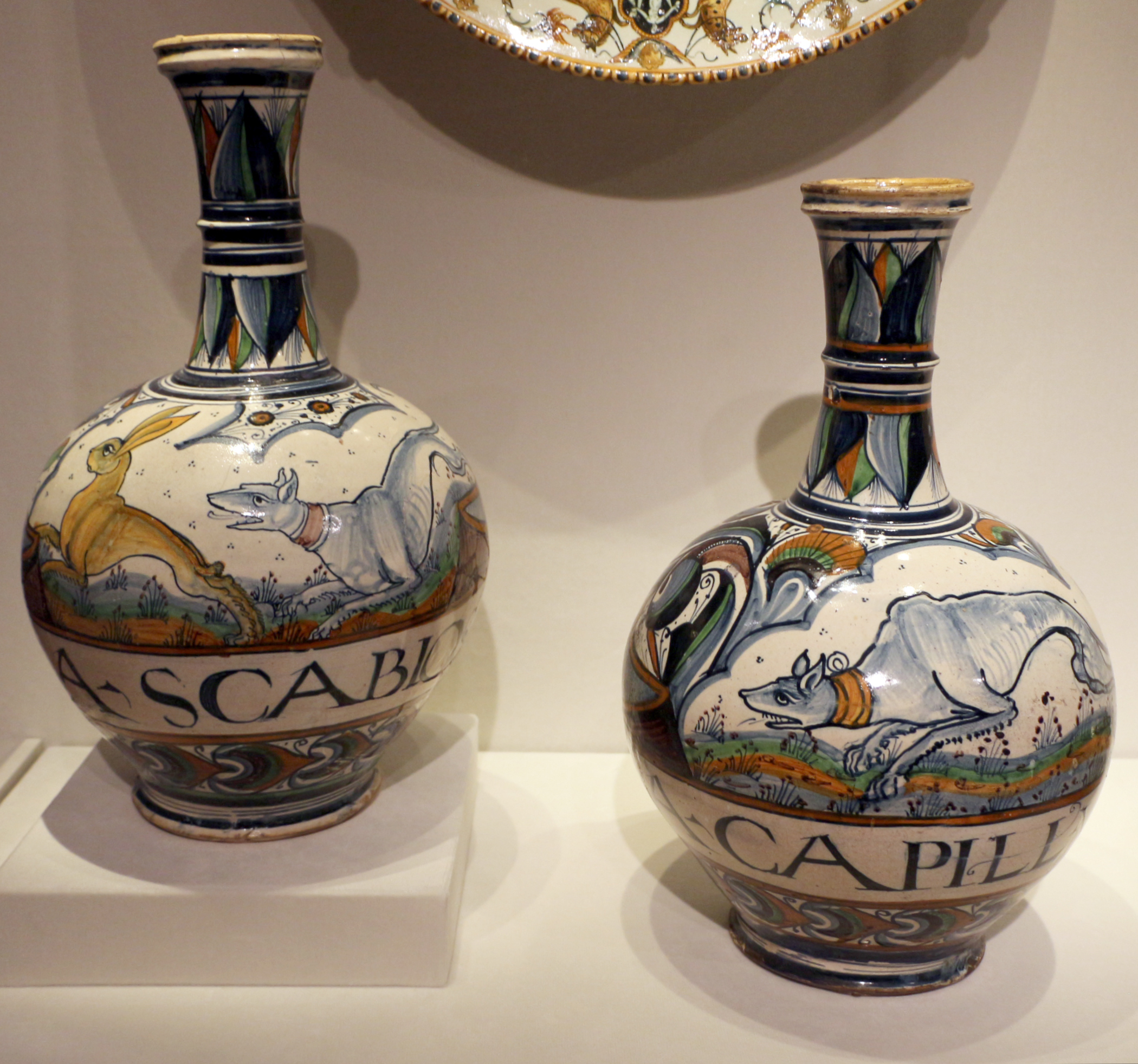
Apothecary bottles, circa 1460–1480

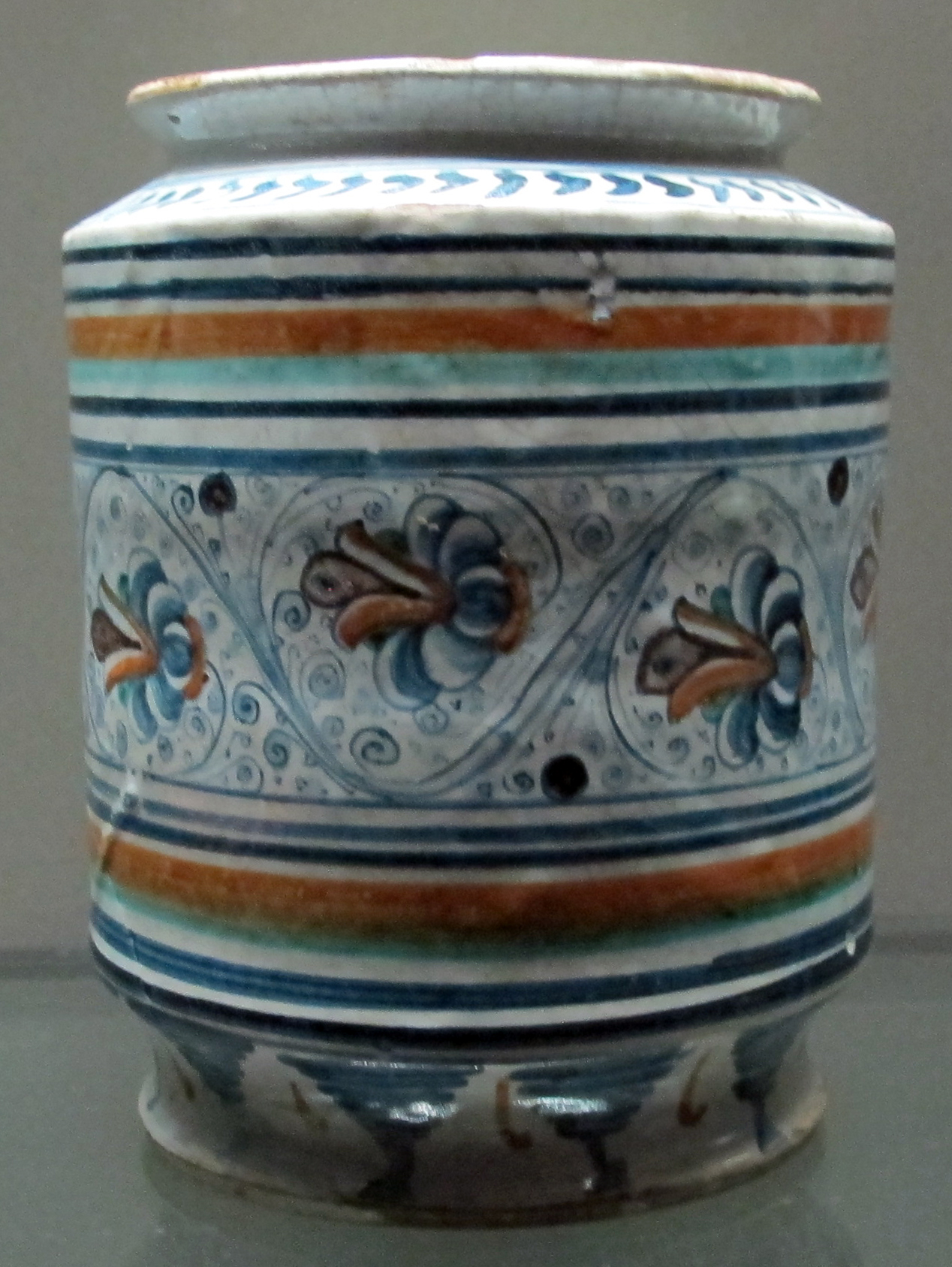
Albarello with Persian Palmette decoration, circa 1500

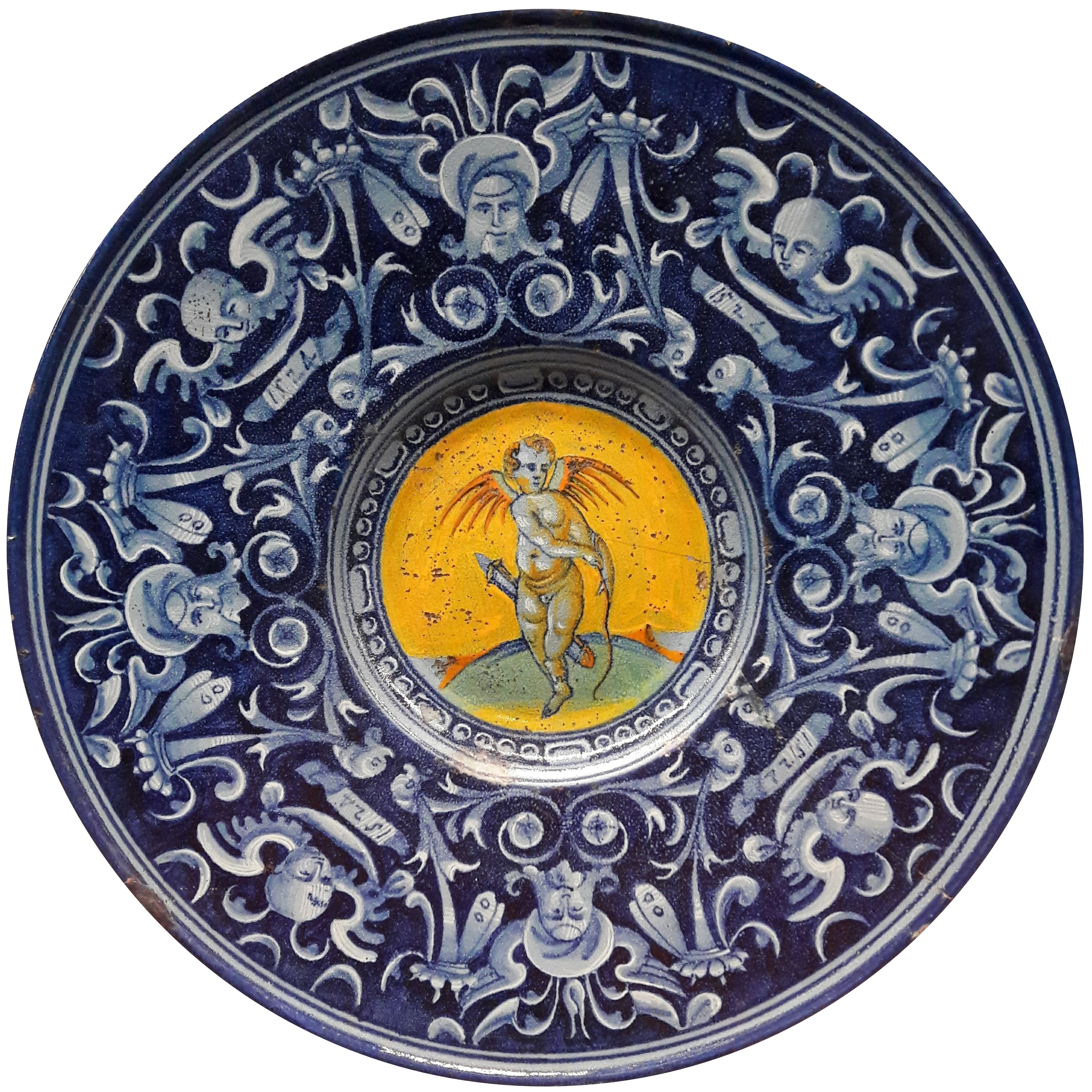
Berettino plate with Cupid, 1524

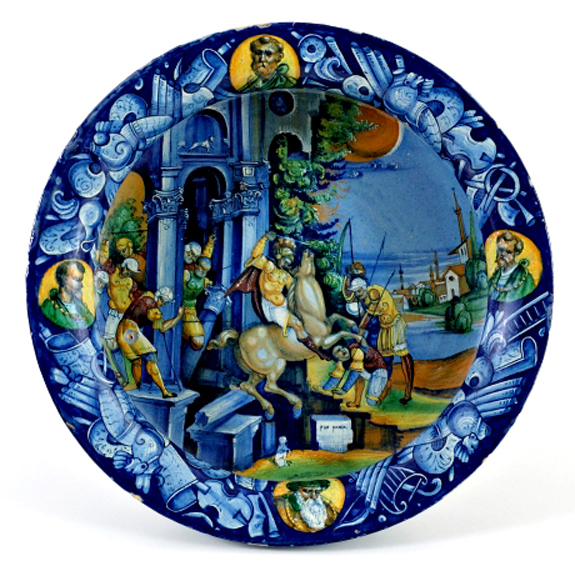
Istoriato bowl, Workshop of Pietro Bergantini, 1529

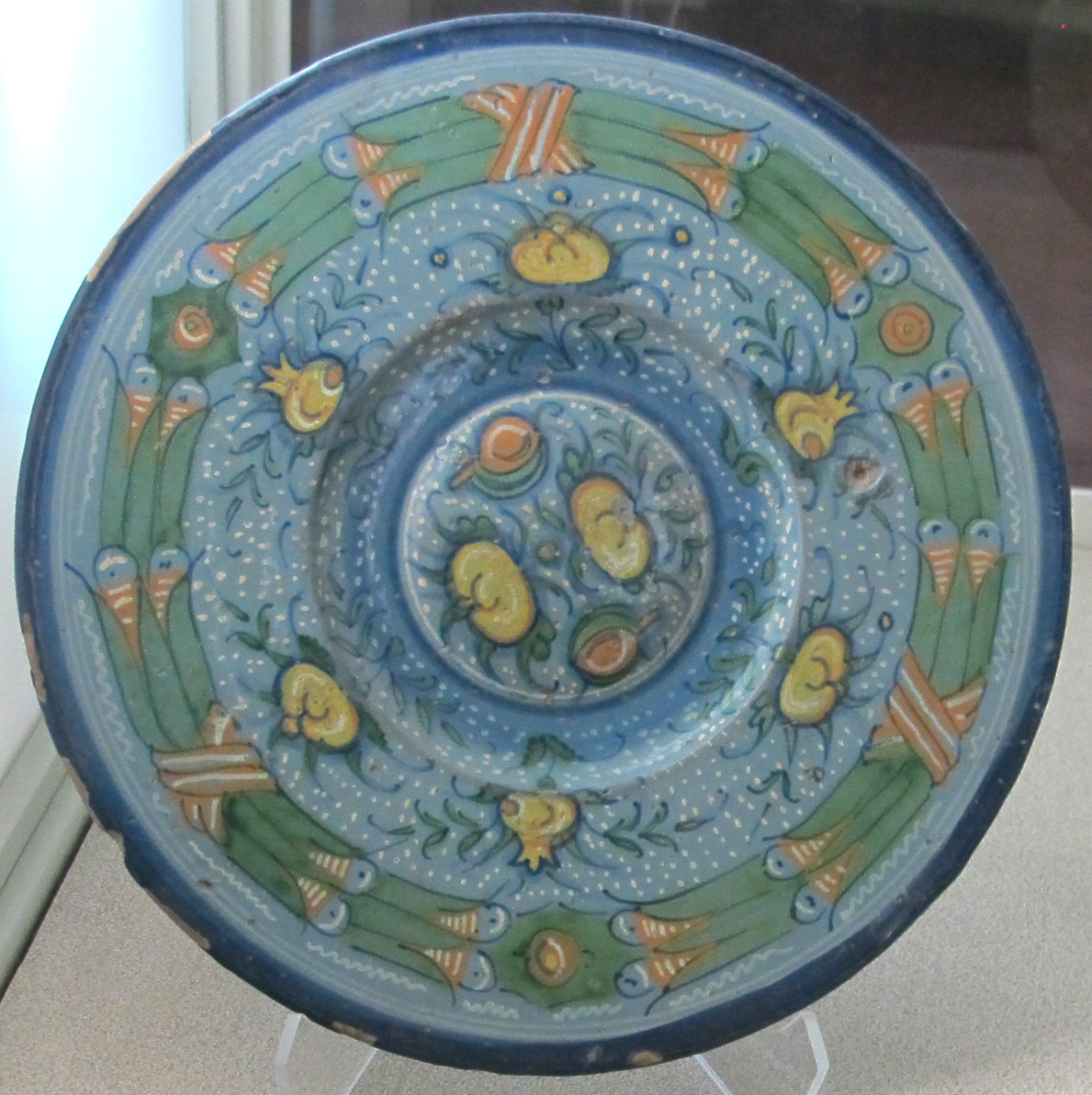
Plate in "Berettino" style, circa 1530–1540

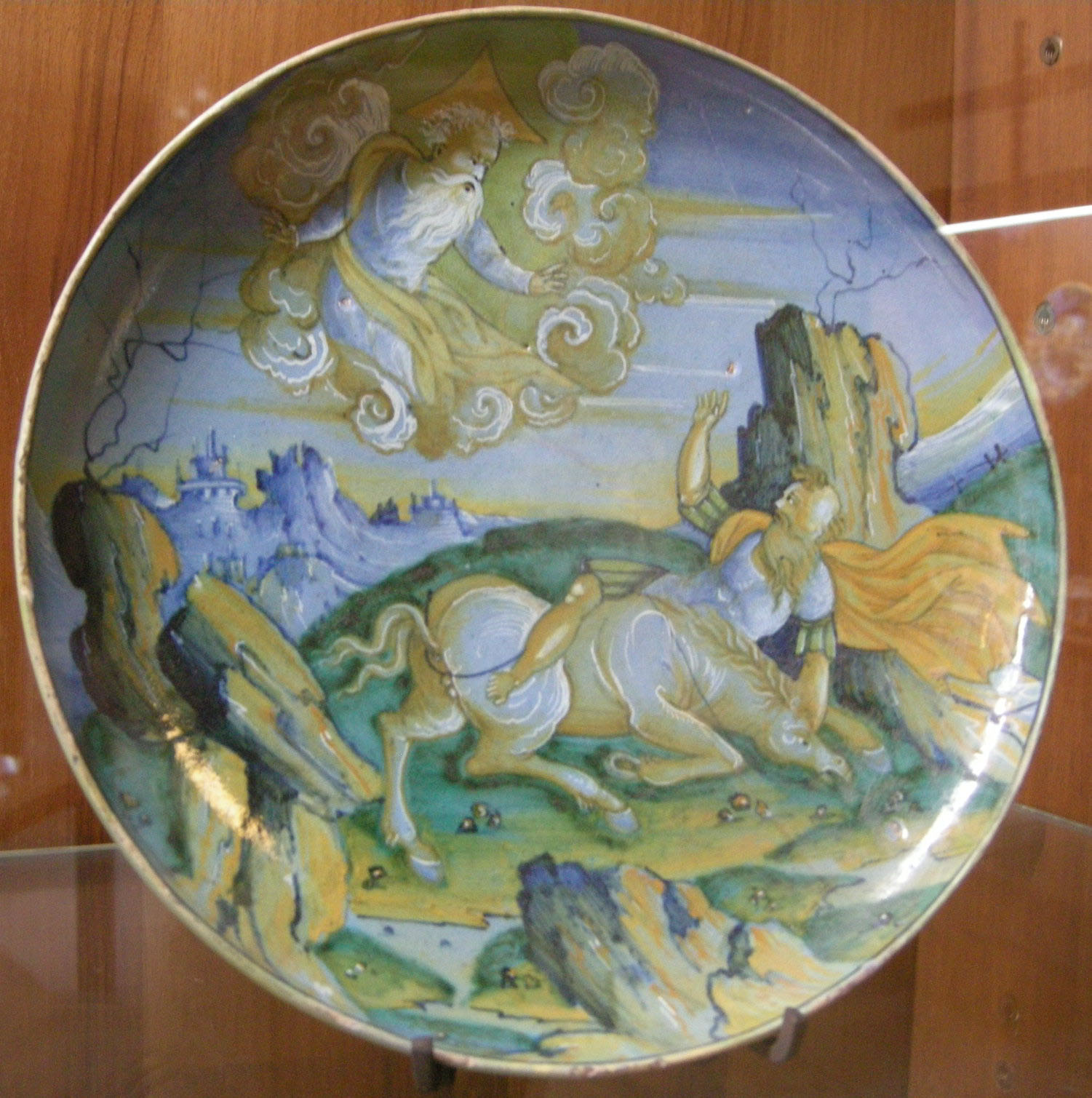
Istoriato bowl, Baldassarre Manara, circa 1535

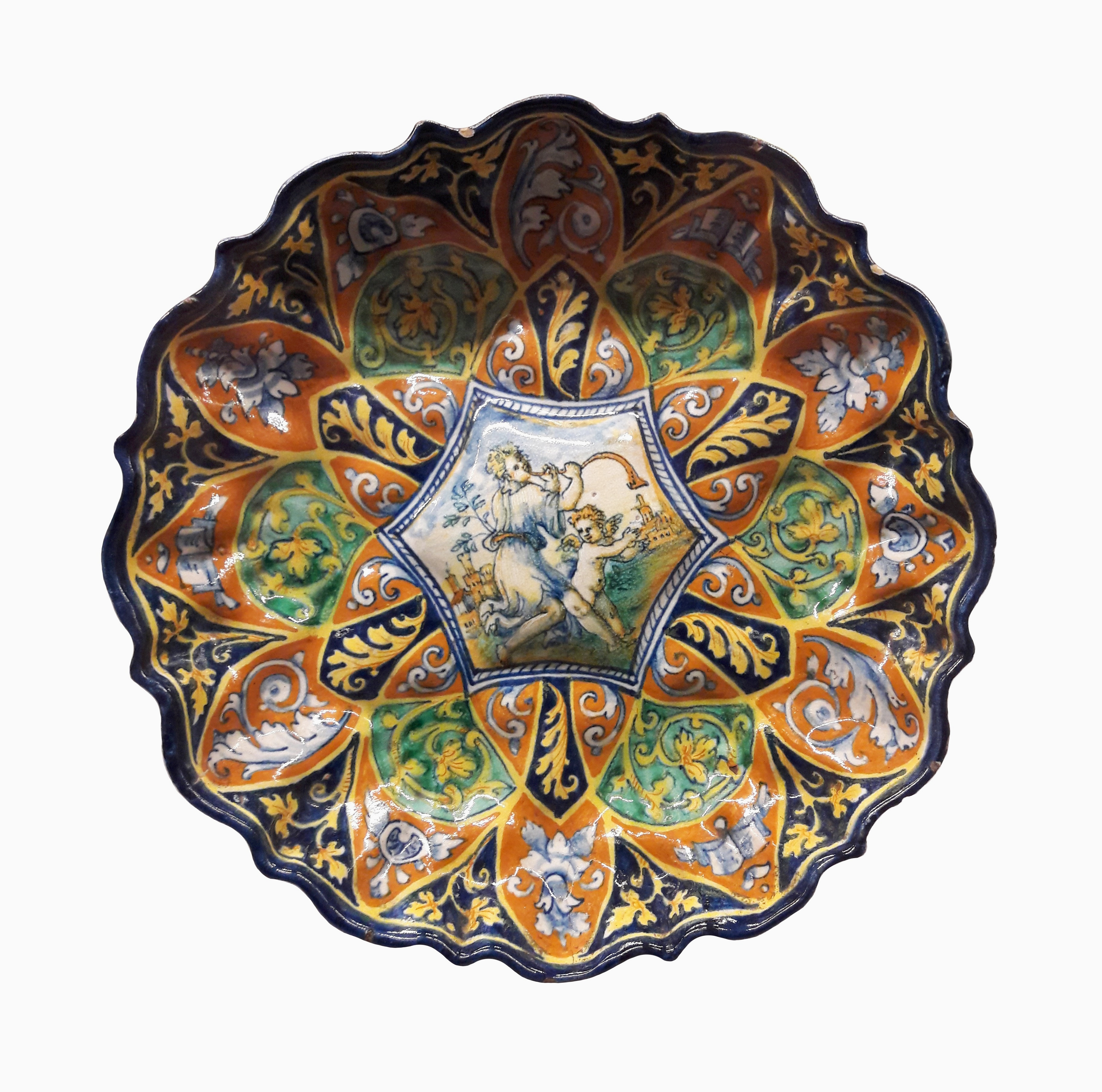
Istoriato bowl "a quartieri", circa 1540

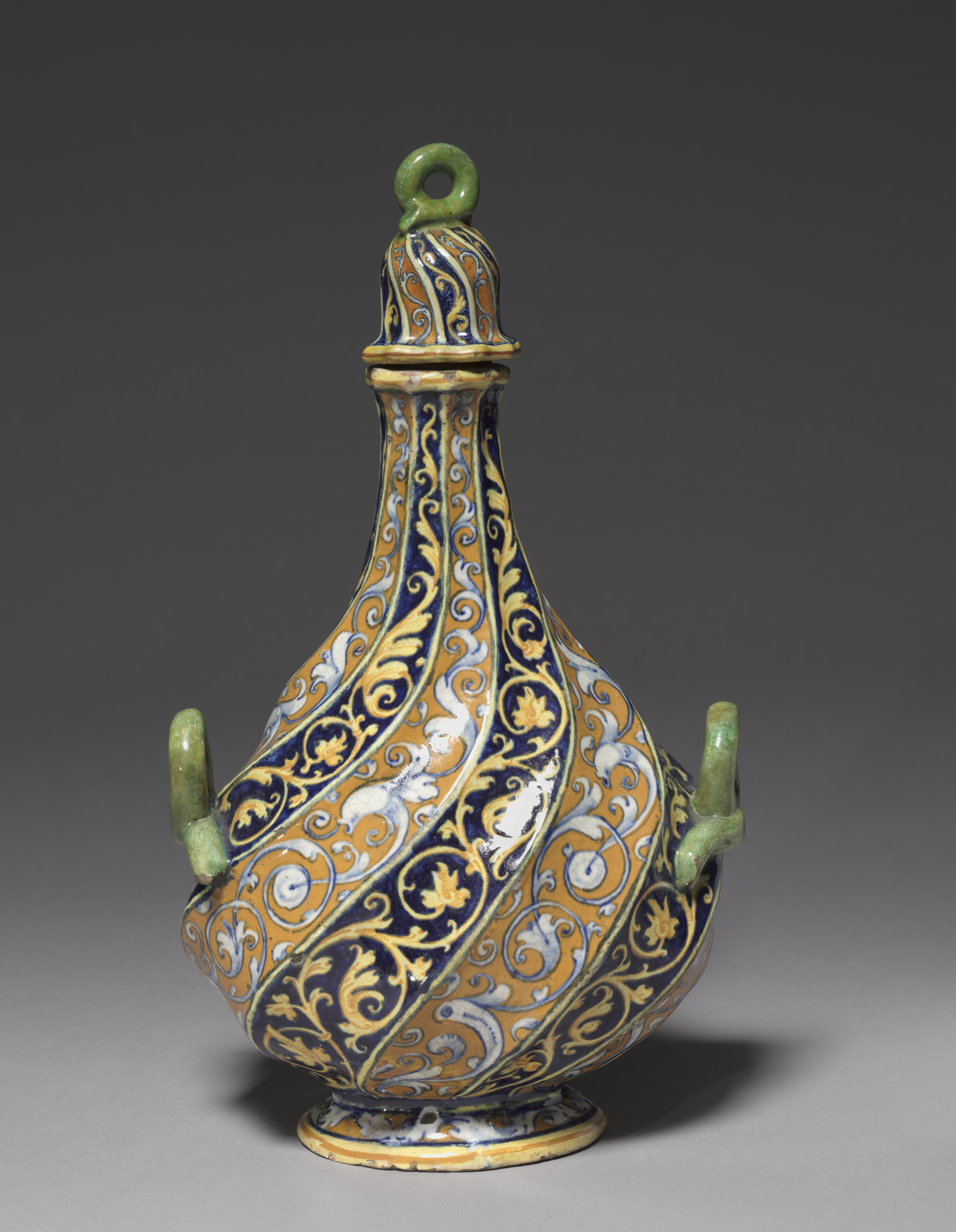
Pilgrim flask, circa 1540

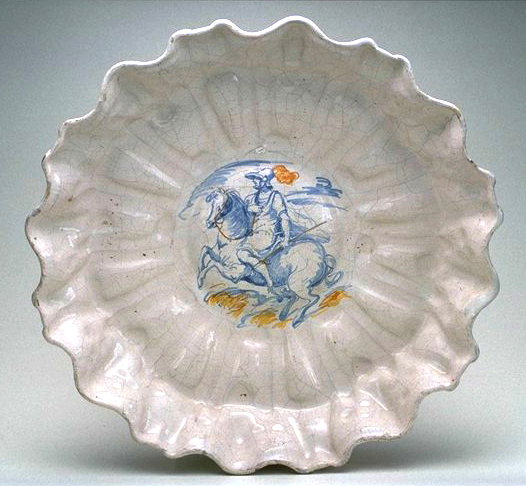
Bowl with figure in compendiario style, Virgiliotto Calamelli, 1560–1599

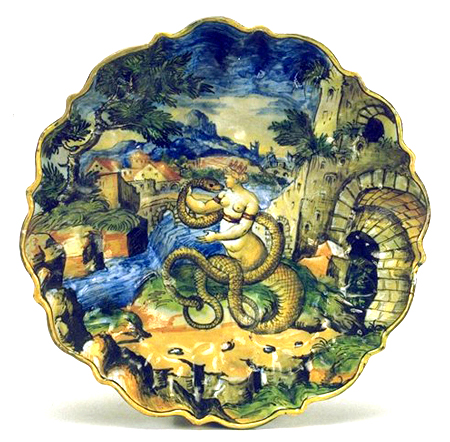
Istoriato bowl, Workshop of Virgiliotto Calamelli, 16th century

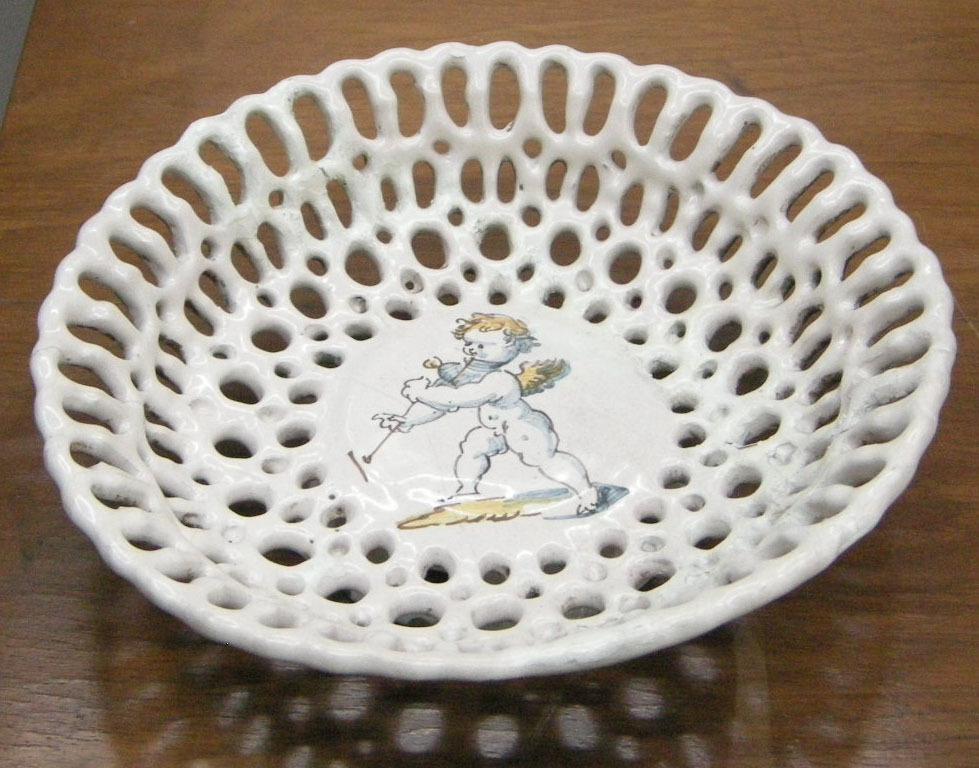
Pierced bowl, late 16th century

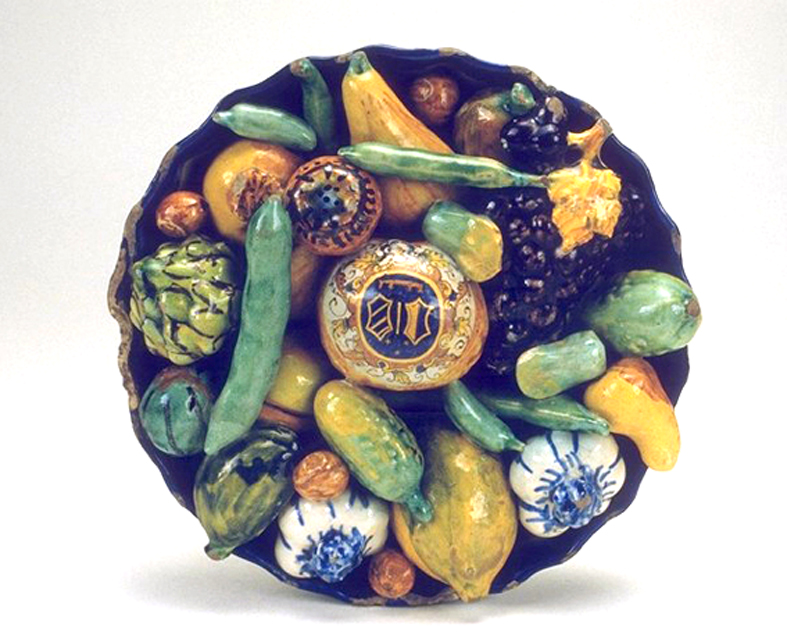
Plate with flowers and fruit in high relief, 16th century

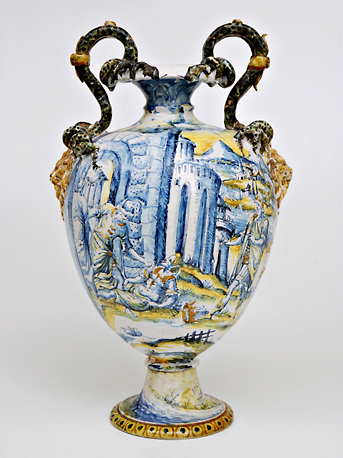
Istoriato vase, Leonardo Bettisi, 16th century

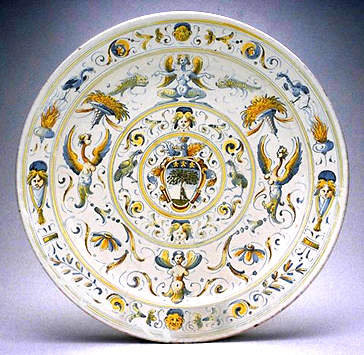
Basin with Raffaellesche decoration, 16th century

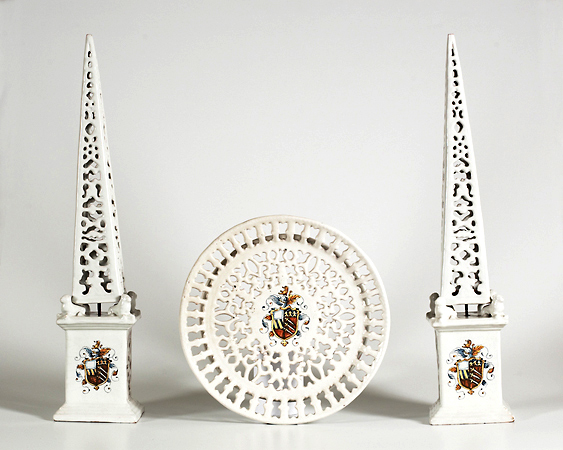
Pierced table centrepieces, late 16th century

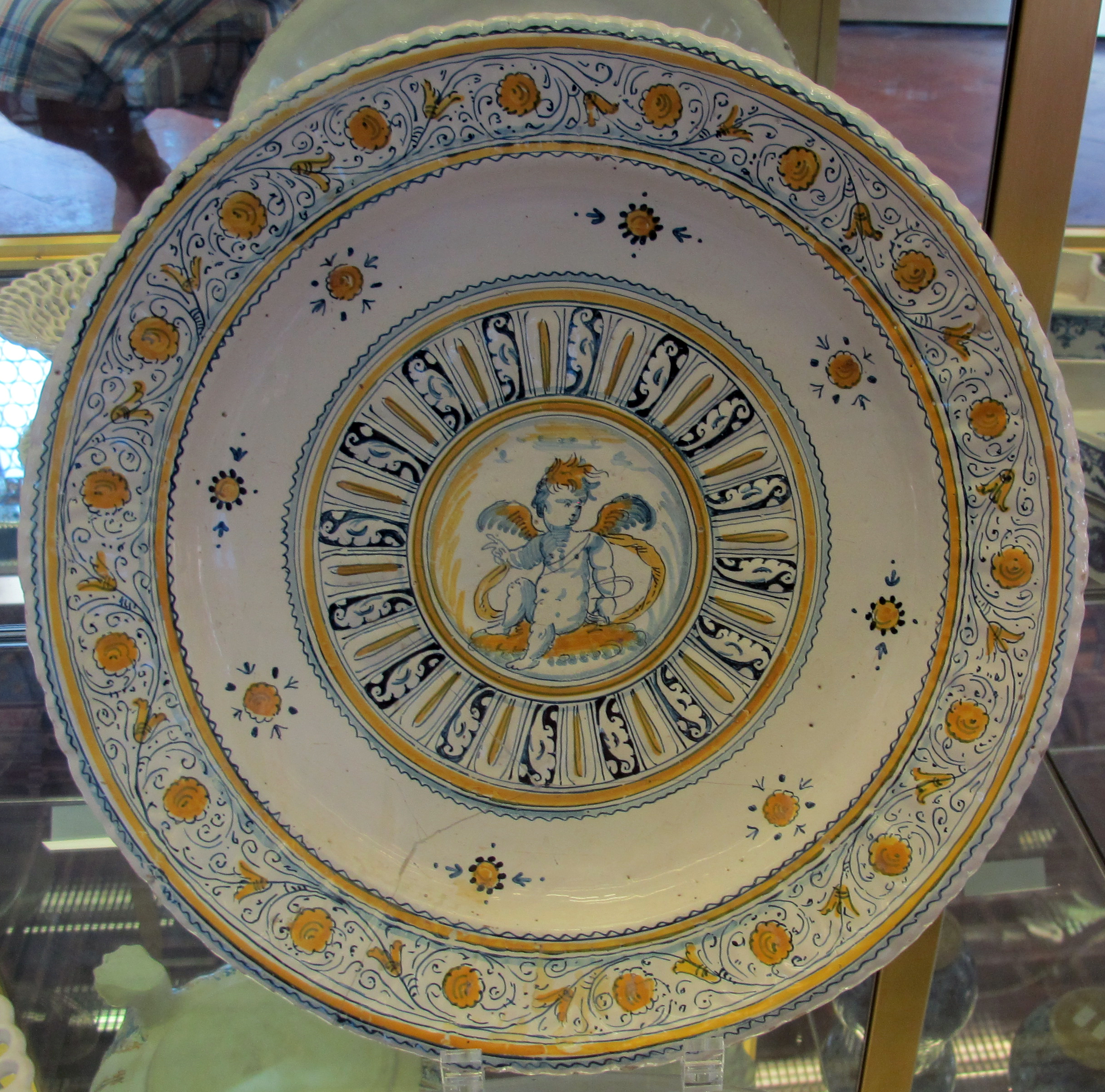
Plate with putto, circa 1610

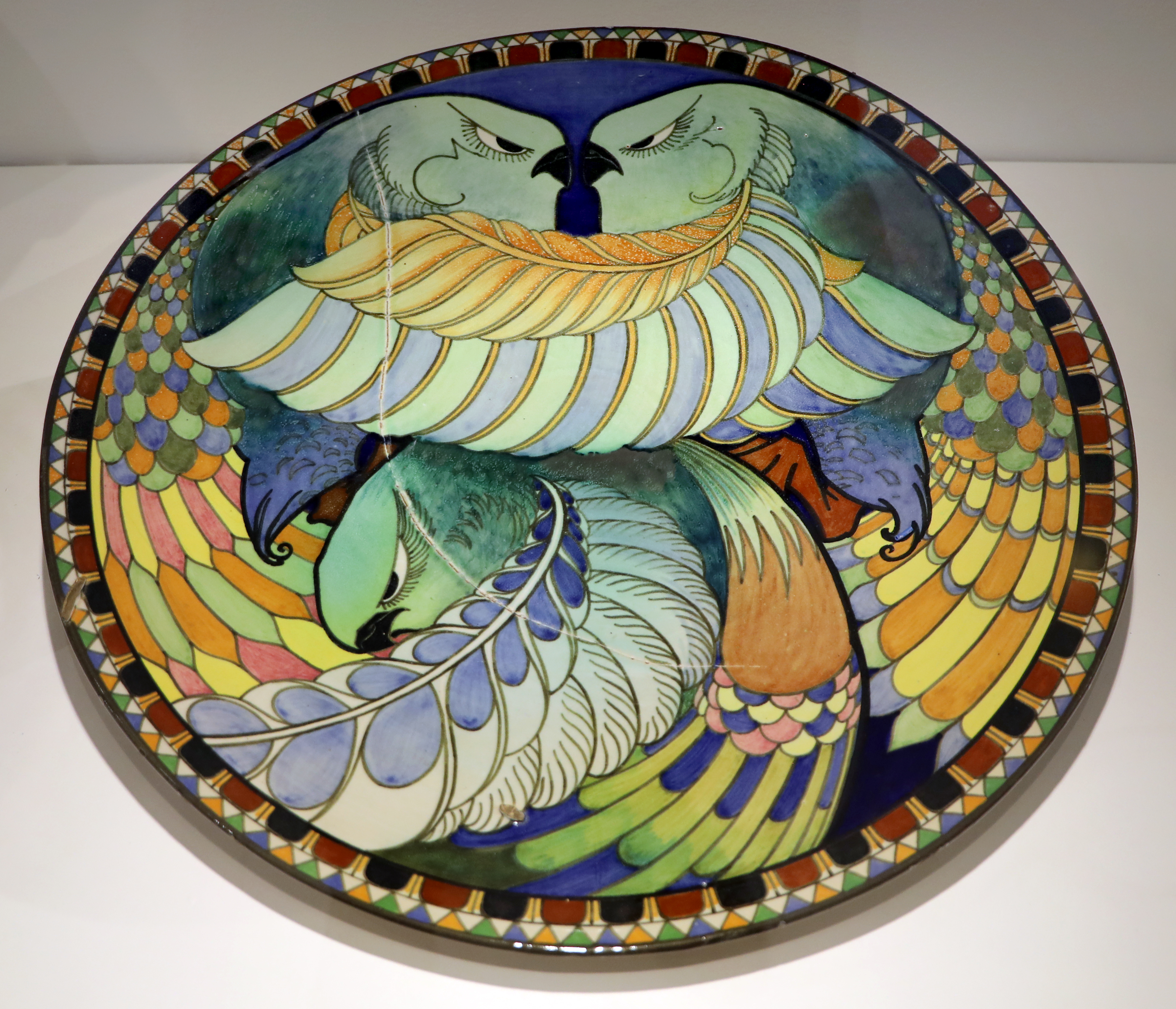
Plate with birds of prey, Achille Calzi, 1918

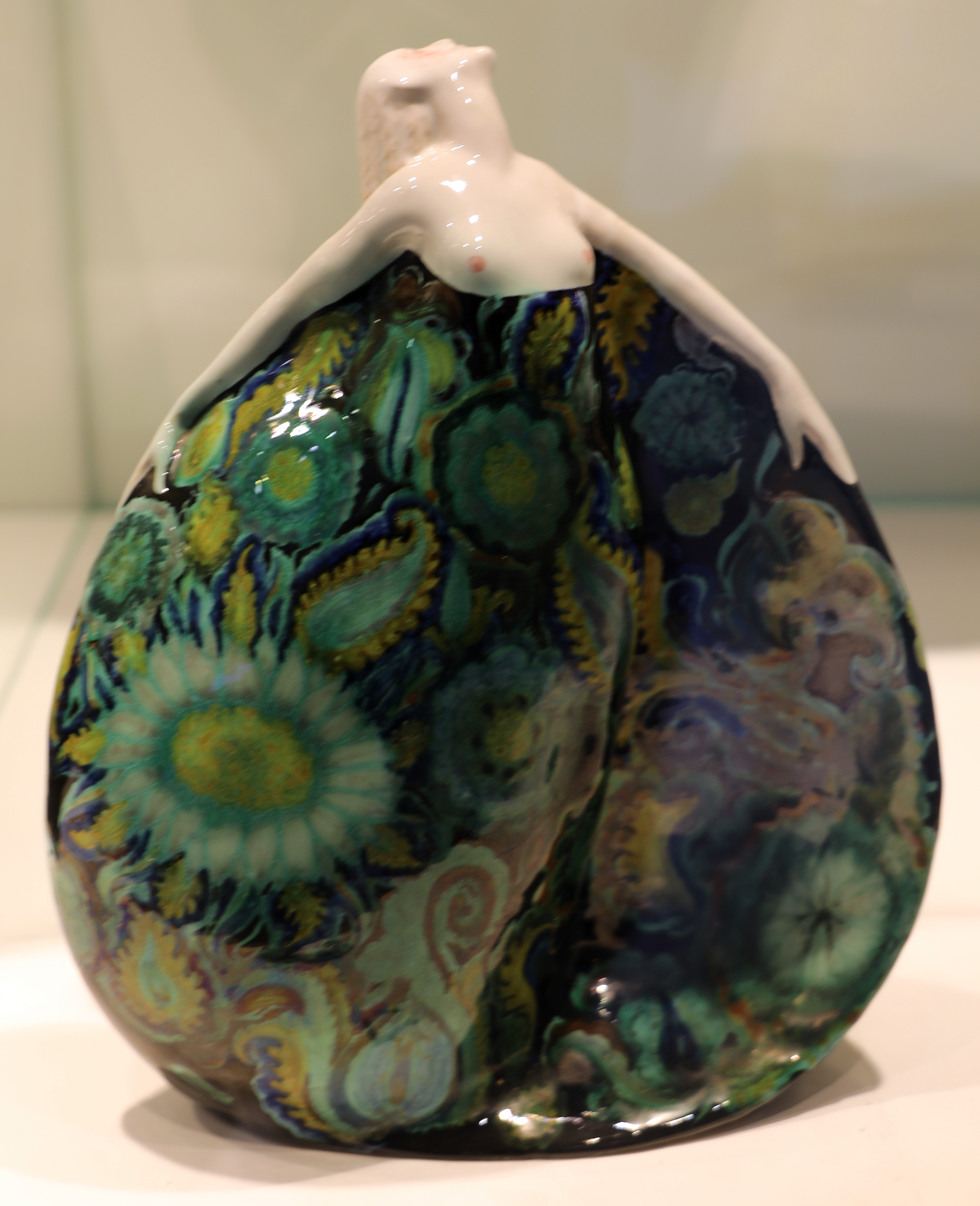
Dancer, Francesco Nonni and Pietro Melandri, 1920–22

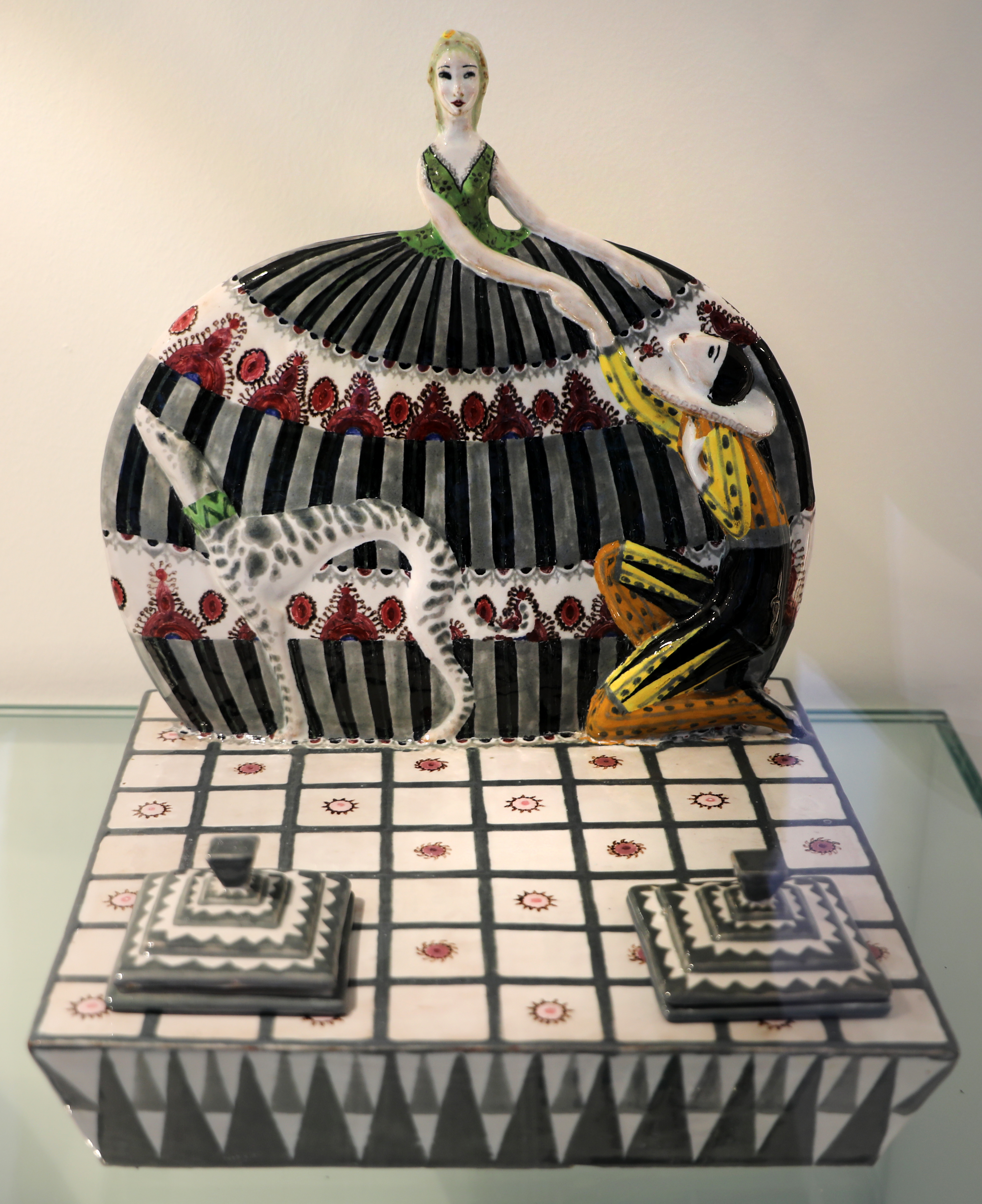
Inkwell, Francesco Nonni, 1930

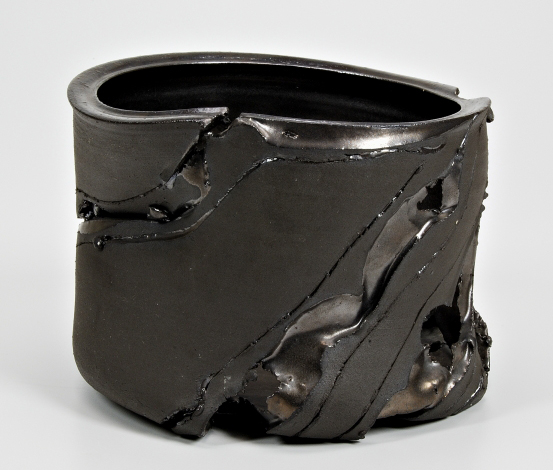
Carlo Zauli, 20th century

== Museums and institutions ==
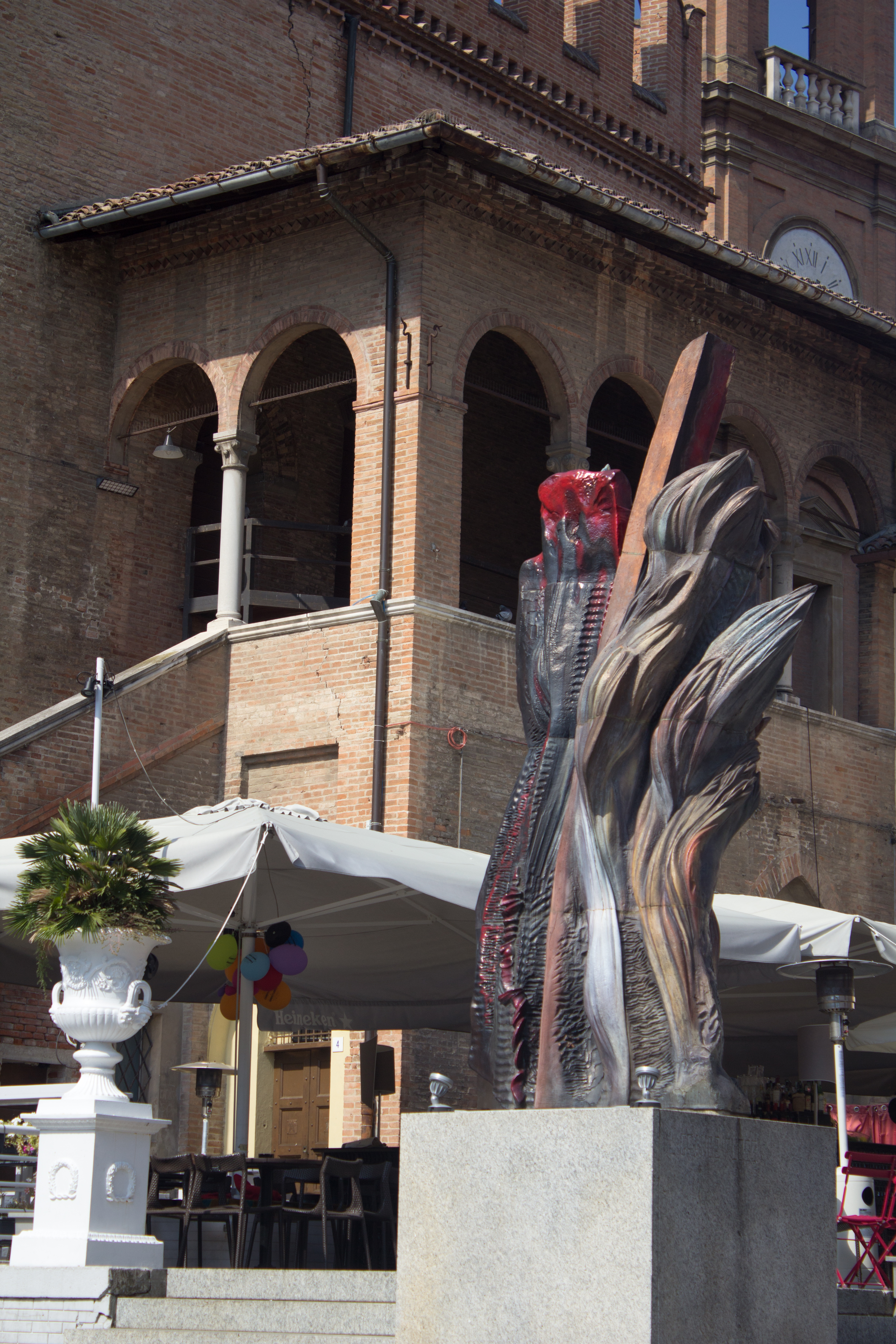
Il Grande Fuoco, Ivo Sassi, 1991, Piazza Martiri della Libertà

Faenza is home to several institutions dedicated to the preservation, study and promotion of ceramics:

- International Museum of Ceramics in Faenza (MIC) – founded in 1908 by Gaetano Ballardini, it is one of the most important museums in the world dedicated to ceramics, with collections ranging from antiquity to contemporary art.
- State Institute of Art for Ceramics "Gaetano Ballardini" – founded in 1916, later named after Ballardini, it has trained generations of ceramists and artists.
- ISIA Faenza – Higher Institute for Artistic Industries, specializing in design and applied arts, with a strong focus on ceramics and contemporary experimentation.
- Drawing Academy "Tommaso Minardi" – art school with a long tradition in ceramic education.

=== Museums-workshops ===
Several museums in Faenza are dedicated to the memory and work of 20th-century masters:

- Carlo Zauli Museum – dedicated to the sculptor and ceramist Carlo Zauli, one of the leading figures of contemporary ceramics.
- Riccardo Gatti Museum – preserves the works and legacy of Riccardo Gatti, innovator of Futurist ceramics.
- Guerrino Tramonti Museum – dedicated to Guerrino Tramonti, known for his chromatic research and experimentation.
- Leandro Lega Museum – dedicated to the ceramist and sculptor Leandro Lega.
- Goffredo Gaeta Museum – preserves the works and theoretical contributions of Goffredo Gaeta.
- Ivo Sassi Museum – dedicated to the ceramist and sculptor Ivo Sassi.

== Events and awards ==
Throughout the year, Faenza hosts various artistic, cultural, and commercial events dedicated to ceramics, involving artists, artisans, scholars, and enthusiasts. The main events include:

- Premio Faenza – International Biennial of Contemporary Ceramic Art: organized by the International Museum of Ceramics in Faenza (MIC) since 1938, held every two years, and dedicated to contemporary ceramic art.
- Argillà Italia – International Ceramics Fair: a biennial event held in Faenza’s historic center, featuring Italian and international exhibitors and activities related to ceramic craftsmanship.
- Buongiorno Ceramica! – Nationwide Festival of Italian Ceramics: a nationwide event promoted by the Italian Association of Ceramic Cities (AiCC), held in several Italian cities; in Faenza it includes workshops, guided tours, and installations devoted to ceramics.
- Made in Italy – Exhibition and Market of Ceramics and Artistic Crafts: an exhibition dedicated to Italian artistic craftsmanship, with a section on contemporary ceramics, including displays and meetings with artisans.
- Mondial Tornianti – World Throwers Championship: an international competition organized by the MIC and the Municipality of Faenza, focused on wheel-throwing techniques and local ceramic traditions.

== Denominations and legal protection ==
Faenza ceramics are protected as a denomination of origin for artistic and traditional ceramics, recognized by Italian law (Law 188/1990).

The city is part of the Associazione Italiana Città della Ceramica (AiCC), which promotes and safeguards traditional ceramic production.

The Ceramica Artistica e Tradizionale di Faenza mark certifies the authenticity and quality of local production.

Since 2025, Faenza has been part of the UNESCO Creative Cities Network in the category of Crafts and Folk Arts, in recognition of its historic ceramic tradition, which combines craftsmanship, design, research, and education within a creative system that is participatory, collaborative, and resilient.

== See also ==
- Maiolica
- Faience
- Italian Renaissance
- Istoriato
- Compendiario

== Sources ==
- Ballardini, Gaetano (1938). La ceramica di Faenza. Faenza: Edit Faenza.
- Liverani, Giuseppe (1957). La maiolica italiana. Milan: Electa.
- Maioliche faentine dall'Arcaico al Rinascimento. Renografica. 1984.
- Bojani, Gian Carlo; Ravanelli Guidotti, Carmen (1989). Museo internazionale delle ceramiche in Faenza. Calderini. ISBN 978-8870194005.
- Ravanelli Guidotti, Carmen (1996). Ceramiche italiane datate dal XV al XIX secolo. Milan: Leonardo Arte. ISBN 8881521202.
- Ravanelli Guidotti, Carmen (2009). La fabbrica Ferniani: ceramiche faentine dal barocco all'eclettismo. Cinisello Balsamo: Silvana.
- Wilson, Timothy (2017). Italian Maiolica and Europe. Ashmolean Museum. ISBN 978-1910807163.
- Busti, Giulio; Cesaretti, Mauro; Cocchi, Franco (2019). La maiolica italiana del Rinascimento: Studi e ricerche. Brepols Pub. ISBN 978-2-503-58285-6.
