= Francesco Grue =

Italian painter

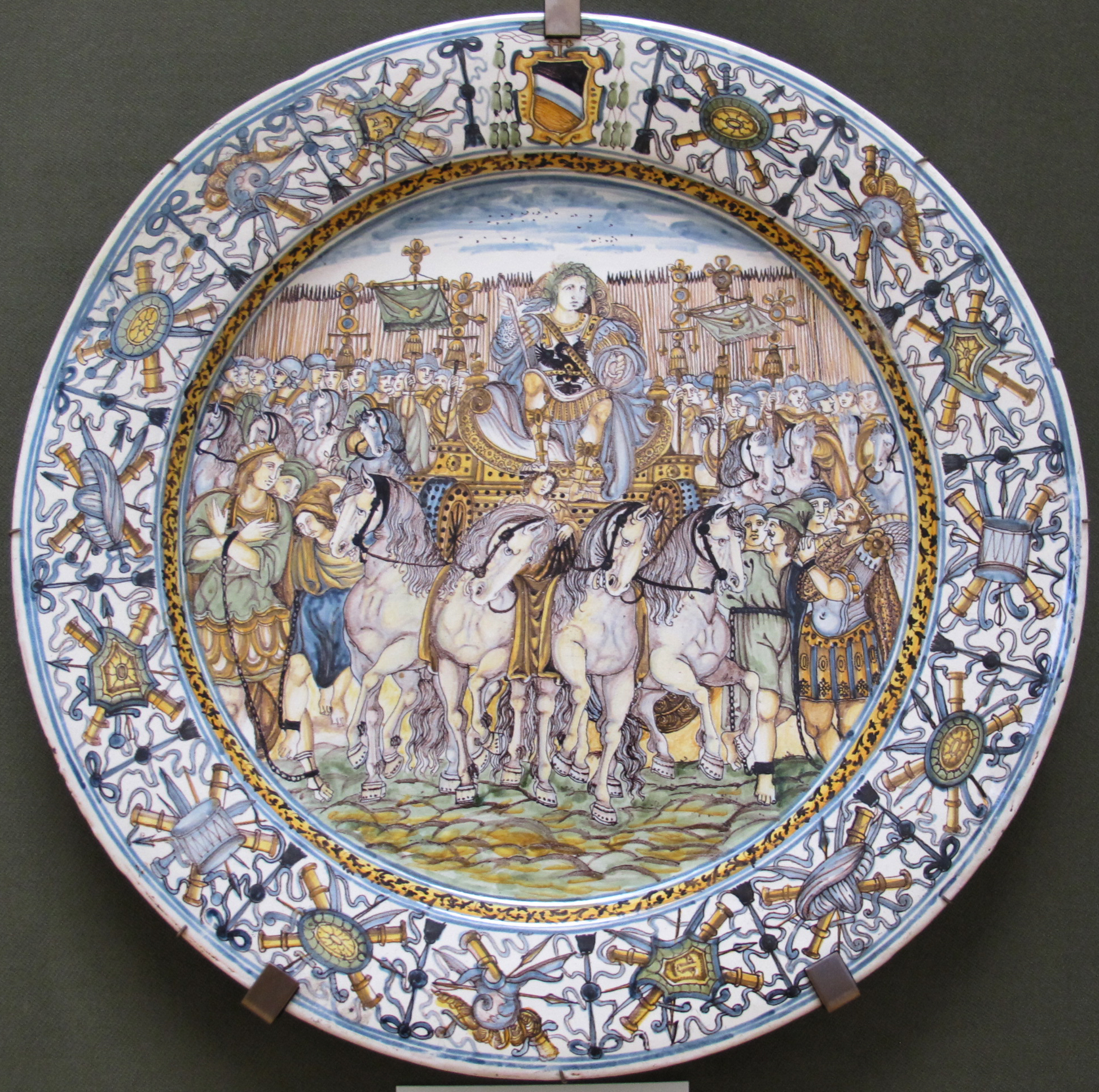
maiolica plate by Francesco Grue, Lindenau-Museum, 1645

Francesco Angelo Grue (Castelli, Abruzzo, 11 September 1618 – 5 October 1673) was an Italian potter and painter.

== Biography ==
Francesco was from a family of maiolica potters and painters. His son Carlo Antonio and grandson Francesco Antonio Xaverio Grue also followed in the family business.
