= Istoriato =

Istoriato maiolica attributed to Guido Durantino and his workshop, depicting Zeus, Hera and Cupid observing the birth of Helen and the Dioscuri (Castor and Pollux), 1550, Boijmans Van Beuningen Museum

Istoriato (Italian, literally: historied) is a style of pottery decoration, particularly associated with maiolica, in which complex narrative scenes are painted onto the surface of an object. The subjects are typically mythological, religious, historical, or literary. The style originated in Faenza, Italy, around 1500 and became particularly widespread during the 16th century. Istoriato decoration was distinguished by the application to maiolica of paintings comparable in ambition and seriousness to contemporary Italian Renaissance easel paintings, with a degree of realism and the use of perspective that differed markedly from earlier forms of pottery decoration.

The painted scene may occupy only the centre of a vessel, surrounded by a border of formal ornament, or cover the entire surface, as was particularly common in wares produced at Urbino. Compositions were derived from paintings, prints, and literary sources, including works associated with Raphael and Albrecht Dürer. Some istoriato works closely reproduce existing compositions, while others are freer interpretations. The term derives from the Latin historia, referring to a narrative or story represented through images.

== History ==
The istoriato style emerged in the early 16th century, with Faenza among its principal centres. It developed within the broader context of the Italian Renaissance, when decorative arts increasingly adopted the narrative subjects, compositions, and visual techniques of contemporary painting. Ceramic painters transferred scenes from paintings and prints onto maiolica, producing compositions based on biblical, historical, and mythological narratives. The use of perspective and the increasingly realistic treatment of figures and settings marked a significant departure from earlier pottery decoration.

During the 16th century the style flourished particularly in the production centres of Faenza, Castelli, Urbino, Deruta, and Castel Durante. Artists and ceramic painters drew on contemporary painting and printmaking, as well as on classical and Renaissance literary sources. Mythological subjects were frequently derived from works such as Ovid's Metamorphoses, while prints provided a means of adapting compositions by major artists for ceramic decoration. Raphael and Albrecht Dürer were among the artists whose work influenced istoriato compositions.

One of the leading early practitioners of the style was Nicola da Urbino, a painter and ceramicist associated with Castel Durante and Urbino. His works helped establish the practice of devoting the surface of a plate or charger to a single representational scene, often adapting compositions from illustrated editions of classical literature and, later, from works associated with Raphael.

Another major figure was Nicola Pellipario, who worked principally for the production of Castel Durante and Urbino wares. His istoriato paintings are characterized by a soft and harmonious palette and a lyrical treatment of mythological subjects, many of them derived from Ovid and Lucian of Samosata. Surviving works include pieces from services made for Isabella d'Este and the Ridolfi family.

Istoriato decoration was also applied more broadly to other artistic surfaces, including mural painting and |architectural decoration, where narrative scenes could illustrate religious, historical, or civic subjects. In architecture, such imagery could have a symbolic or didactic function and was often connected with the public or commemorative role of a building.

The style was widely imitated outside Italy, particularly in France, and remained an important form of maiolica decoration throughout the 16th century. In later periods, the term istoriato continued to be used more broadly for figurative and narrative decoration on ceramic and other surfaces.

== Characteristics ==
Istoriato works share several characteristics, regardless of the particular workshop or production centre:

- a complex narrative scene, often involving multiple figures and settings;
- subjects derived from mythology, the Bible, history, classical literature, or contemporary literary sources;
- the adaptation of compositions from paintings, prints, and illustrated books;
- the use of perspective and relatively naturalistic representation;
- a close integration of the painted composition with the shape and surface of the object;
- a distinction between the narrative image and purely ornamental decoration.

In maiolica, the narrative composition may be confined to the central field of a dish and surrounded by an ornamental border, or may extend across almost the entire surface. The latter arrangement is particularly associated with istoriato wares produced in Urbino and related centres.

== See also ==
- Maiolica
- Italian Renaissance
- Renaissance art
- Renaissance architecture
- Faenza ceramics
- Nicola da Urbino
- Nicola Pellipario
