= Castelli, Abruzzo =

Castelli
- Comune
- Comune di Castelli
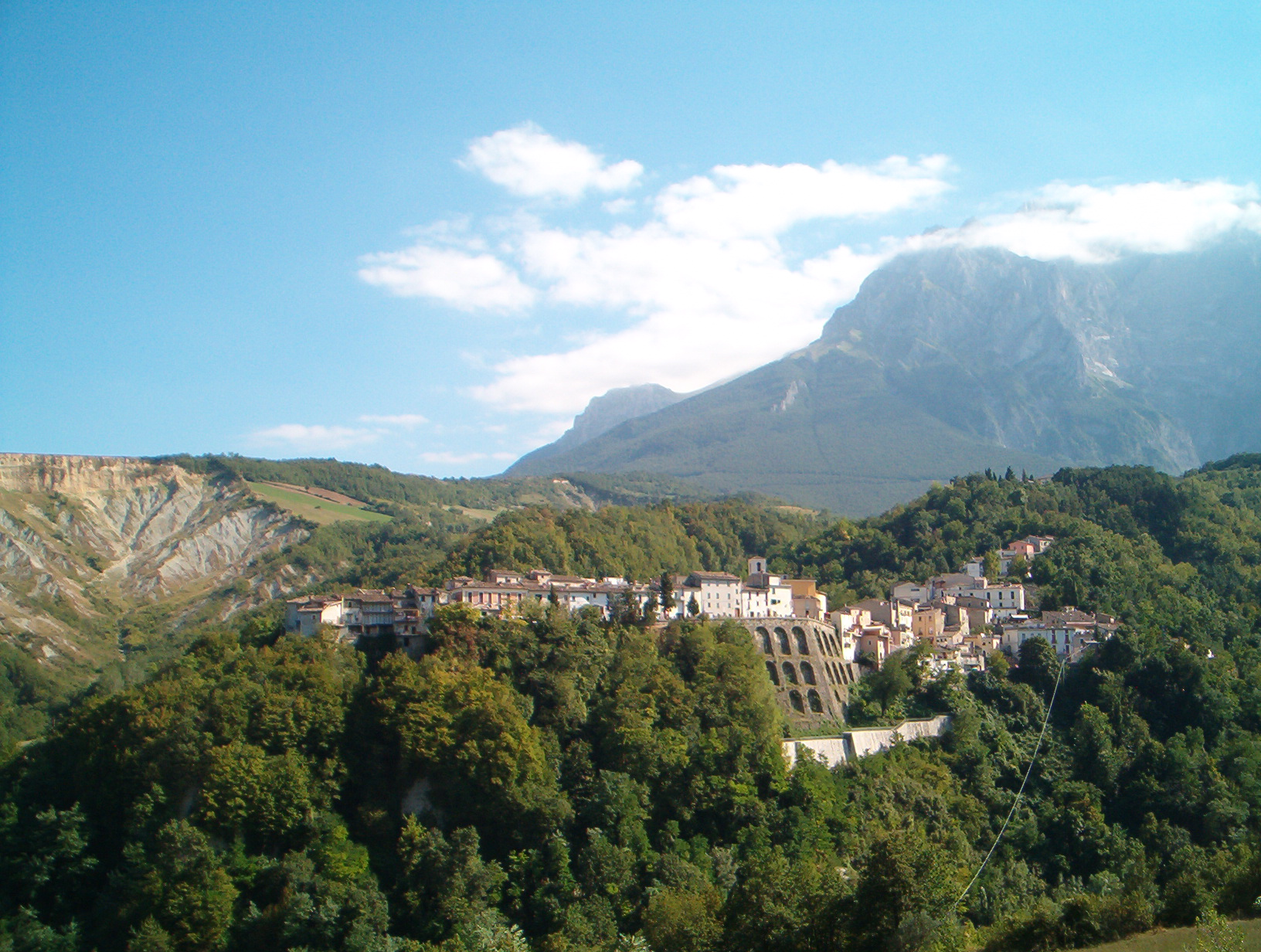

- Coat of arms

- Location within Italy Location within Abruzzo
- Coordinates: 42°29′17″N 13°42′42″E
- Country: Italy
- Region: Abruzzo
- Province: Teramo (TE)
- Frazioni: Befaro, Carraro, Casette Faiano, Colledoro, Morriconi, Palombara, San Rocco, Villa Rossi

Government
  - Mayor: Enzo De Rosa

Area
  - Total: 49 km^{2} (19 sq mi)
- Elevation: 497 m (1,631 ft)

Population (1 January 2010)
  - Total: 1,257
  - Density: 26/km^{2} (66/sq mi)
- Demonym: Castellani
- Time zone: UTC+1 (CET)
  - Summer (DST): UTC+2 (CEST)
- Postal code: 64041
- Dialing code: 0861

Castelli (Abruzzese: Li Castìllë) is a comune in the province of Teramo, Abruzzo, Italy, included in the Gran Sasso e Monti della Laga National Park. It is one of I Borghi più belli d'Italia ("The most beautiful villages of Italy").

The medieval hill town lies beneath Mount Camicia on the eastern side of the Gran Sasso Massif. Castelli is best known for its maiolicas, a form of decorative ceramic, which were collected by the nobility of Europe for centuries and which were at their pinnacle from the 16th through 18th century and are still produced today by local artists. Castelli maiolica was a favorite dinnerware of Russian Tsars. One of the most valued collections of Castelli ceramics is now housed at the Winter Palace of the Hermitage State Museum in St. Petersburg, Russia.

Castelli's main church is San Donato, which holds a maiolica altar-piece by Francesco Grue (1647) and a medieval silver cross of the Sulmona school. Its tiled ceiling is believed to have been decorated by the ceramics master Oracio Pompei or artists working from his studio.

Today, Castelli hosts an art institute and ceramics museum as well as many ceramics shops and studios.
