= Nicola da Urbino =

Italian painter (1480–1538)

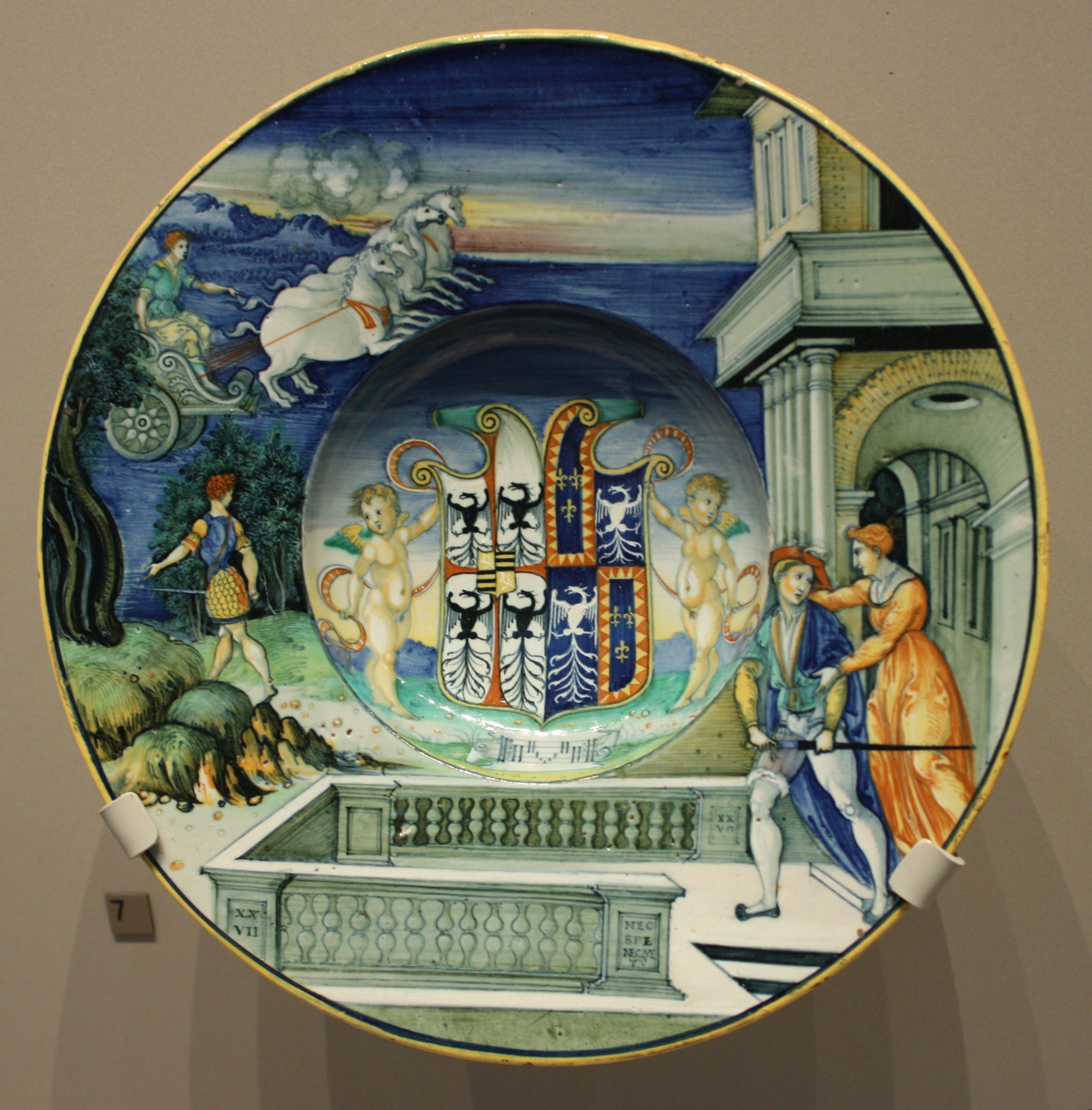
Maiolica plate by Nicola da Urbino, ca.1524, with the arms of Isabella d'Este and her late husband (Victoria and Albert Museum, London)

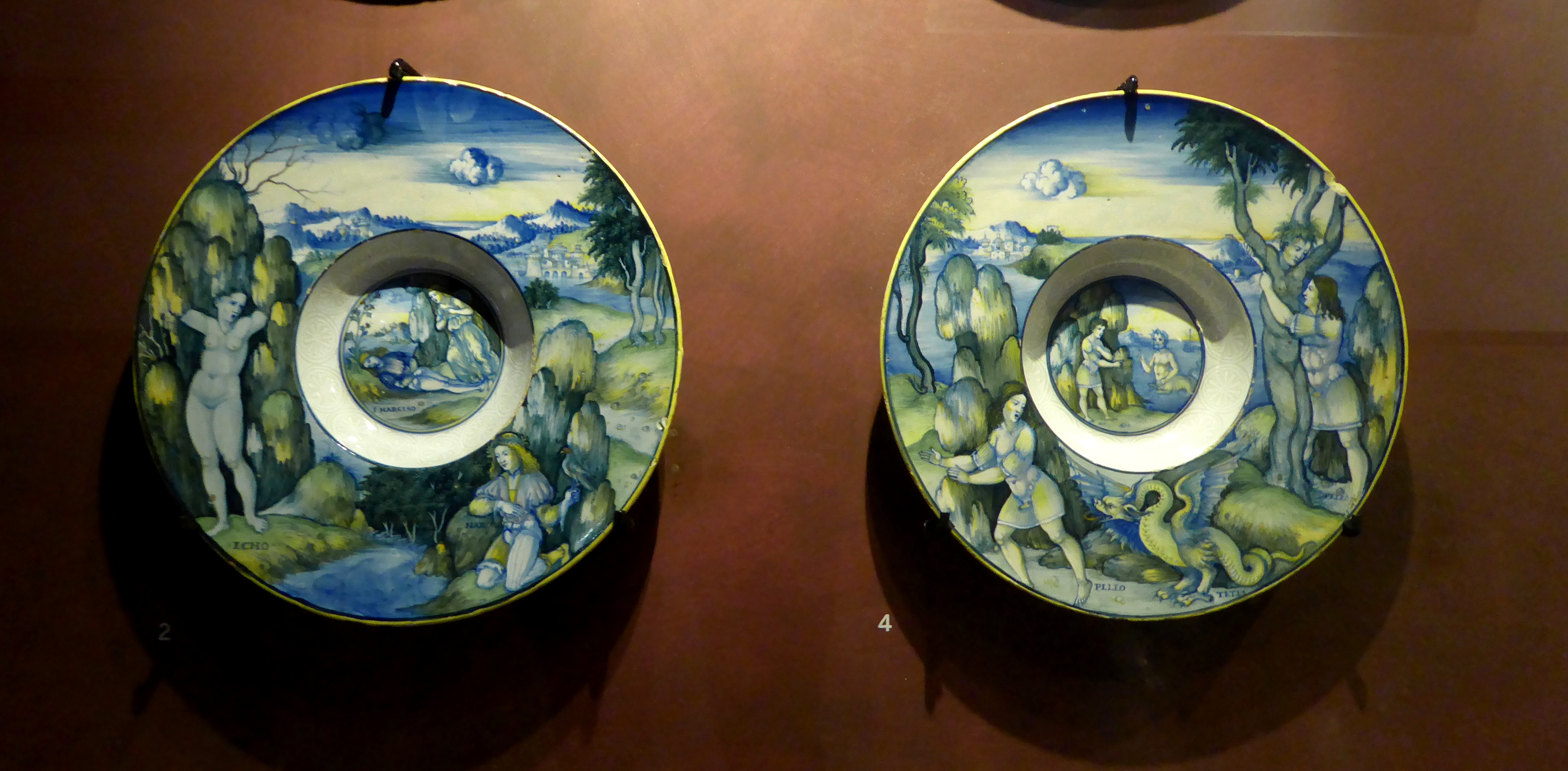
Two plates in Urbino's "Correr Service" located in the Museo Correr, Venice.

Nicola da Urbino (ca. 1480 – 1540/1547) formerly confused with Nicola Pellipario has traditionally been designated as the Italian ceramicist from Castel Durante in Marche who introduced into painted maiolica the new istoriato style, in which the whole surface of a plate or charger is devoted to a single representational scene. Nicola's scenes were often derived by freely adapting woodcuts from Romances or the Latin classics, such as the illustrated Ovid's Metamorphoses printed at Venice, 1497, to which he returned so often that it appears that a copy of it must have lain in his shop; however, he did not merely copy: "the often crude outlines of the black-and-white figures are converted by him into embodiments of supple vitality," Bernard Rackham observed. Later he gave up book illustrations in favour of compositions of Raphael, mediated through the engravings of Marcantonio Raimondi, and, in at least one case, by direct access to a drawing by Raphael of Michelangelo's David, seen from the rear. Nicola often introduced prominently pieces of schematic and severely frontal architecture in the Renaissance manner. His plate of Solomon Adoring an Idol in the Museo Correr adapts an illustration from Hypnerotomachia Poliphilii.

== See also ==
- Francesco Xanto Avelli, another istoriato maiolica painter.
