= Lodi ceramics =

Italian ceramic

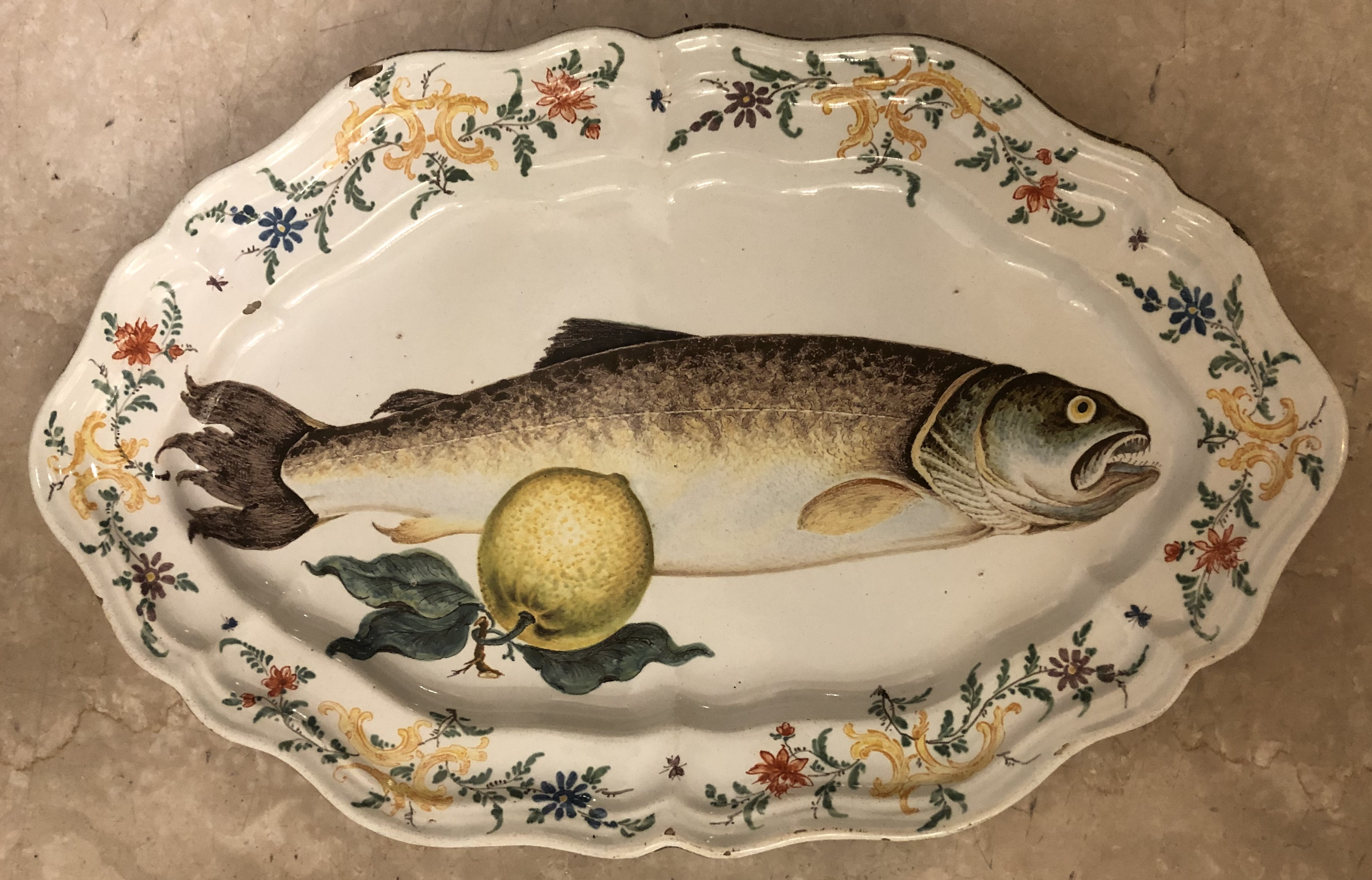
Dish with trout, Antonio Ferretti's factory, 1750-1760, underglaze decoration.

Lodi ceramics are ceramics produced in Lodi, a city in the Lombardy region of Northern Italy. Their artistic quality reached its peak in the 18th century.

== History ==
=== From the origins to the 17th century ===
The production of ceramic in the Lodi region has ancient origins. Findings include fragments from pre-historic period and amphoras, little votive statues and lamps decorated in relief from the Roman period.

A large production of terracotta for architectural decorations was developed in the 14th century, such as in the facades of the churches of Lodi, and in particular in the ornaments of the cloister of the Ospedale Maggiore, in the decorations of Palazzo Mozzanica, and in Piazza Broletto and Piazza Mercato. The first written documents testifying to the presence of furnaces in the Lodi area date back to the 16th century and then to the 17th century. The production of ceramics had little economic importance. This was due to the little dimension of the local market, which mostly required ceramics for ordinary use; moreover the production of ceramics was hindered by the many taxes, both on the import of the raw material, the earth from Stradella, and on the export of the products. Finally, furnaces could not be built in the city, because of fire risk and the nuisance of fumes.

The presence of ceramics manufacture in the 16th century and of at least 3 furnaces in Lodi in the 17th century is well documented. These furnaces must have been capable of producing high quality ceramics, given the importance of some orders, such as that for the House of Gonzaga in 1526 and that by Cardinal Federico Borromeo in 1623. Furthermore, the ceramics of Lodi must have had a good reputation considering that Lodi ceramics workers are documented to be present in Savona in 1545, in Brescia and Como areas and in Veneto in the 17th century and given customs documents that certify the export of Lodi ceramics throughout the Duchy of Milan, up to Borgomanero. Unfortunately, no 17th century ceramics from Lodi have been preserved, only fragments.

=== 18th and 19th century ===
Following the war of the Spanish Succession, at the beginning of the 18th century the territory of Lodi was annexed, with the Duchy of Milan, to the realm of the House of Habsburg of Austria. Economic reforms were introduced that boosted economy and trade. In the field of ceramics however many duties on raw materials and exports remained. In spite of these duties, a few factories were established in Lodi, including that of Coppellotti, already active in the 17th century, Rossetti and Ferretti, which produced ceramics of the highest quality in Lodi. Artists and decorators were able to move more freely than before and this enabled the production of ceramics in Lodi to acquire techniques and decorations from Northern Europe and France, such as the Bérain decoration and a third, lower temperature firing. Ceramics workers and artists, as well as products, were found in northern and central Italy, in particular in Bassano, the Modena area and Sassuolo, Piedmont and Pesaro. In 1796, the battle of Lodi between Napoleon Bonaparte and the Austrian troops marked the decline of ceramic production in Lodi, due both to the material damage suffered by the Ferretti factory located near the battleground by the Adda river, and to the economic decline during the period of the Napoleonic Wars and the following restoration.

In 1823 the Ferretti furnace was taken over by Dossena, who managed it as a modern business. Ceramics were no longer handcrafted on commission, but produced to be sold on the market. After a period of success witnessed by exports to Ireland and Scotland and by the purchase of some ceramics by the House of Savoy, the furnace closed at the end of the 19th century.

== Materials and techniques ==
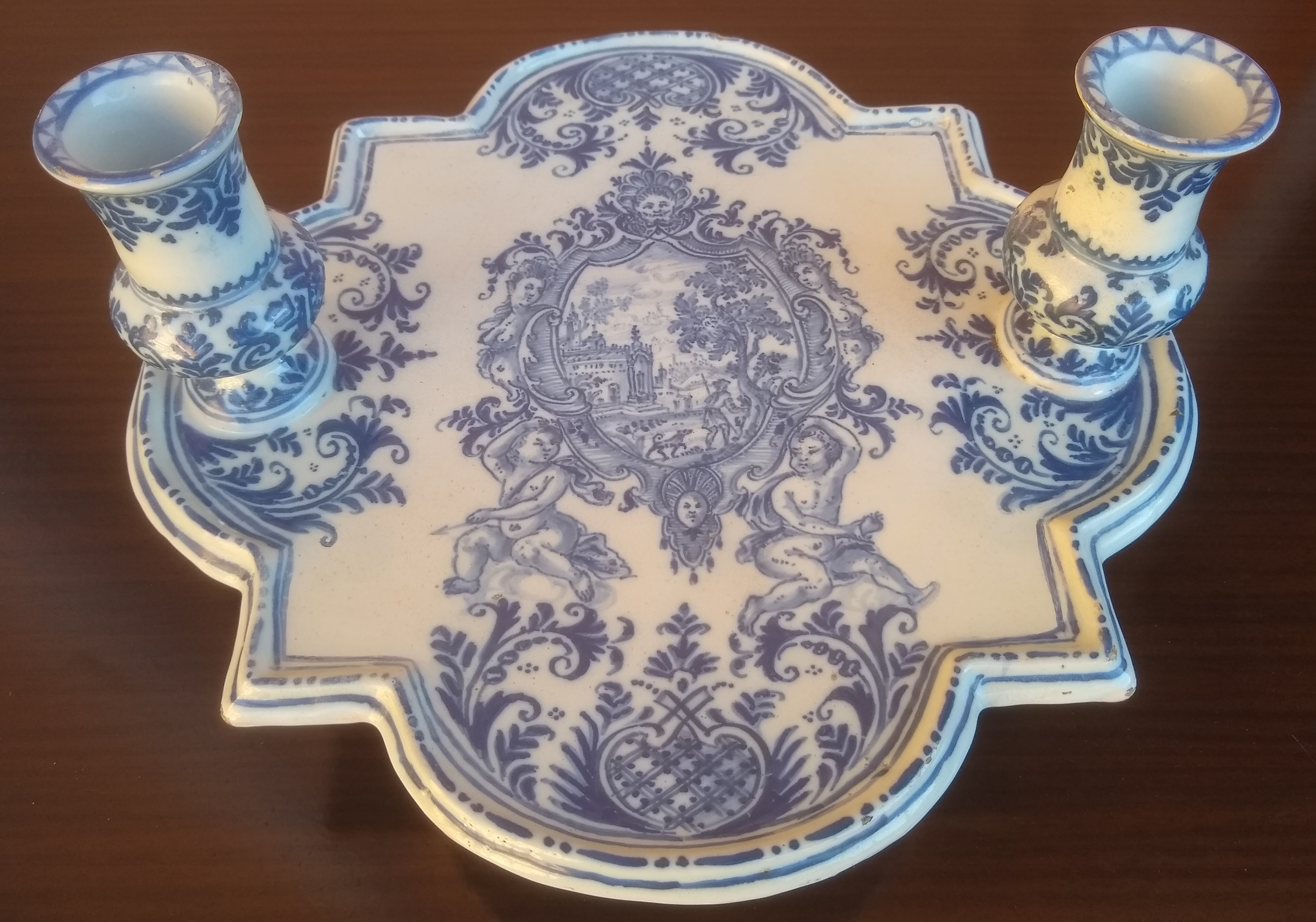
Maiolica stand, Coppellotti factory, 18th century, gran fuoco

The main material for the production of ceramics was the earth of Stradella, a clay rich in limestone, which, thanks to its malleability, made the ceramics very thin and light. The main component for the glaze was sand from San Colombano al Lambro, rich in silicon, but tin was also added to the glaze. Tin-glazing made the ceramics uniform. Having a tin based glaze, Lodi ceramics are to be considered maiolica. The firing technique was based on gran fuoco (double firing) or on piccolo fuoco (third firing).

=== Gran fuoco ===
The gran fuoco technique, also known as underglaze decoration, was the only one in use until the mid 18th century, but was still used even after the introduction of the piccolo fuoco (third fire) technique around 1750. Two firings were carried out at about 950 °C. With the first firing, the product was hardened and could then be glazed and painted, with the glaze not fixed yet by the second firing. The colours spread into the un-fired glaze. Since colours were painted over un-fired glaze, which was porous and absorbent, any errors could not be amended. Only those colours that could withstand the high temperature of the second firing could be used: manganese for violet, antimony for yellow, iron for a reddish colour, cobalt for blue, copper for green. Cobalt blue tended to spread to the glaze, creating blue hues, and this also happened when it was mixed with yellow to create green. Proper red colour was rare, given the high chances of burning during firing at high temperature. Strong shades of orange or manganese brown were often used instead

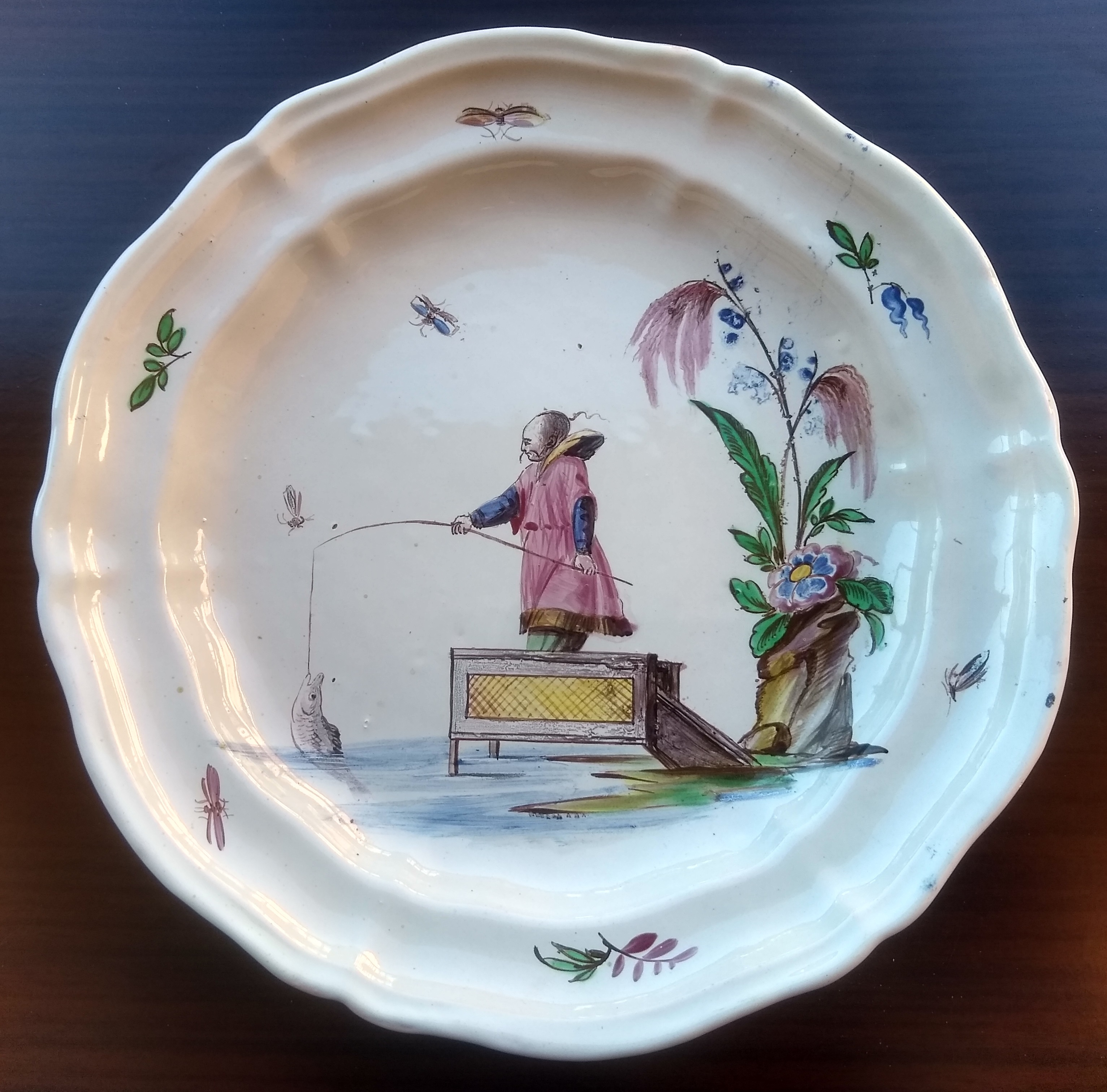
Maiolica dish, Oriental style, Ferretti factory, 1775, piccolo fuoco

=== Piccolo fuoco ===
In the second half of the 18th century the technique of third fire – piccolo fuoco, also known as overglaze decoration, was introduced, which made it possible to obtain a greater range of more vibrant colours. After two firings at about 950 °C, identical to those of the technique of gran fuoco, the glaze, already vitrified, was painted with colours that would have degraded at higher temperature and a third firing was carried out at about 600-650 °C. The fact that colours were painted on a surface already vitrified meant that errors could be corrected. One of the new pigments that could be used thanks to the third firing was Purple of Cassius, a red obtained from gold chloride, which made it possible to introduce various shades of red, from pink to purple. The first European factory where the piccolo fuoco technique was developed was that of Paul Hannong in Strasbourg. Antonio Ferretti was one of the first artisans to introduce this technique in Italy

== Factories ==
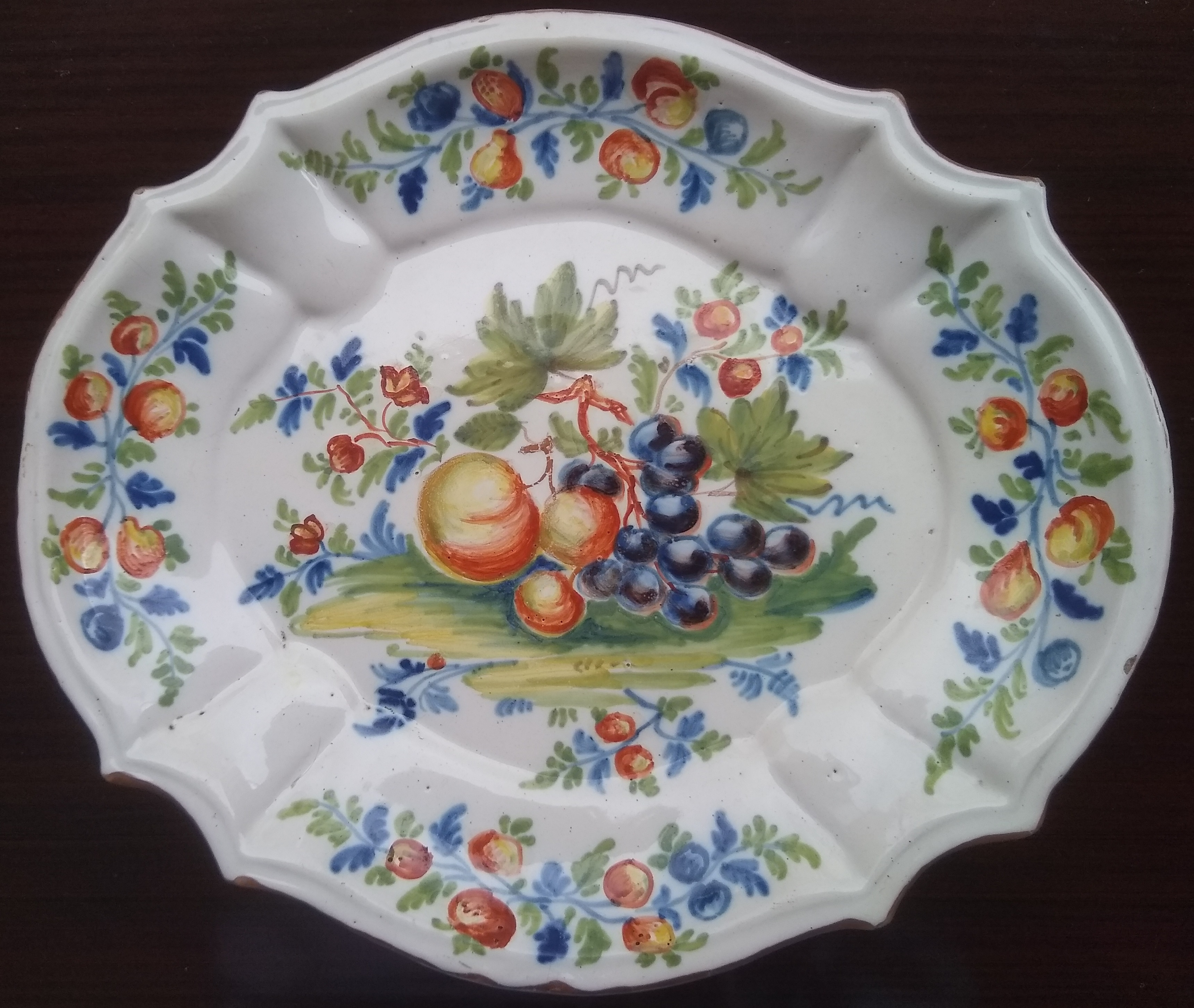
Ceramic dish with fruit decor, underglaze firing, Coppellotti factory, 1740 circa

=== Coppellotti ===
The Coppellotti factory was active from 1641 to the end of the 18th century; the best ceramics date back to the period 1735-1740 and were produced with the gran fuoco technique: plates, centerpieces, teapots, coffeemakers, sugar bowls. Some of the decorative motives were influenced by French ceramics, in particular the decoration known as 'De lambrequins et rayonnants', introduced from Rouen, with arabesques, draperies and geometric-floral compositions arranged in a radial pattern. Most of these ceramics are in turquoise monochrome. There are also many other original polychrome decorations representing fruit, fish, landscapes, castles, peasants, wayfarers, music players, oriental figures, accompanied by animals, such as birds and dogs

=== Rossetti ===
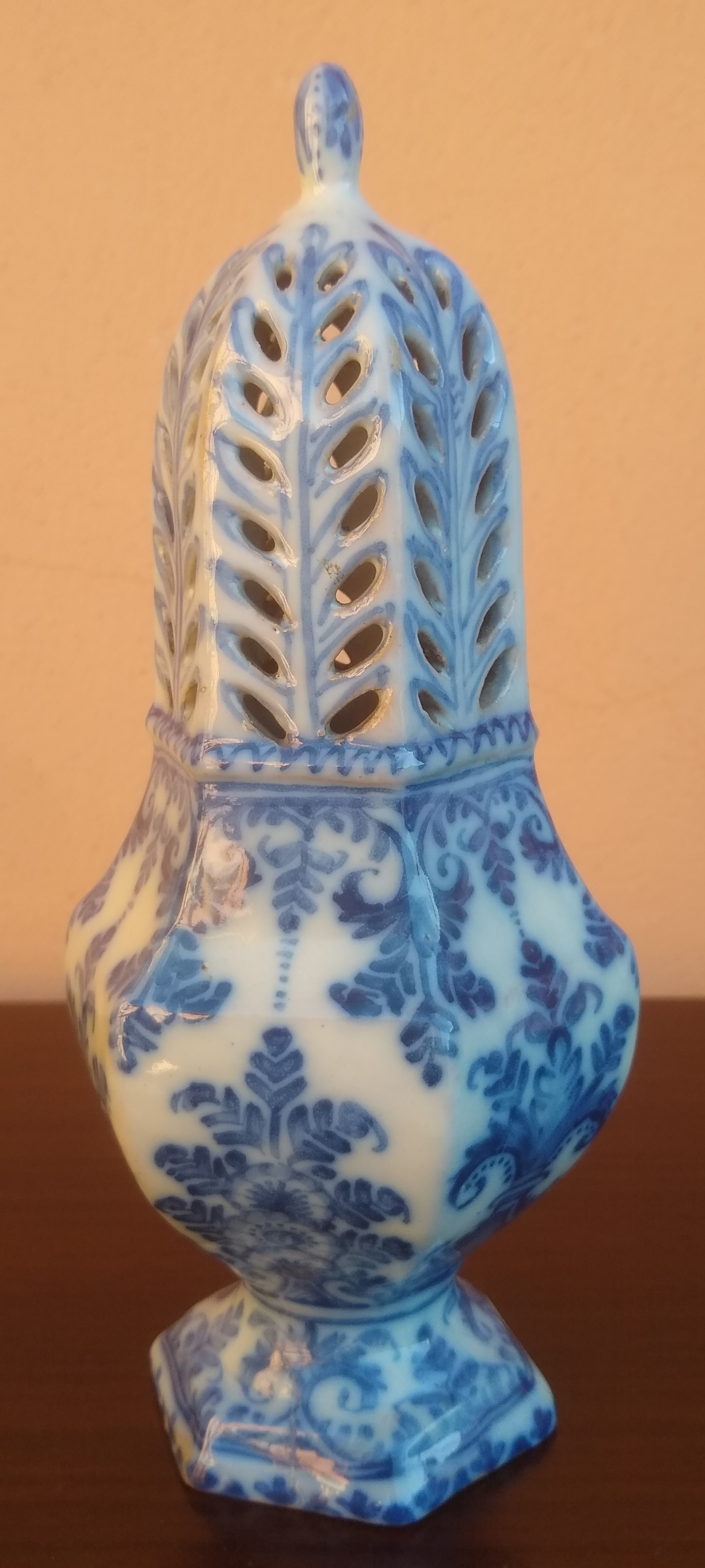
Maiolica sugar castor, attributed to Rossetti factory, 1729-36, geometric floral decor in blue, gran fuoco

The Rossetti factory was active in Lodi between 1729 and 1736. Rossetti ceramics were fired with the Gran fuoco technique and most are in monochromatic turquoise. Rossetti excelled in the decoration known as the 'Bérain' style, which takes its name from the French decorator Jean Bérain the Elder, with pillars, balustrades, capitals, urns, shells, stylized leaves garlands, divinities and satyrs. Some ceramics feature landscapes in the center, with views of cities and castles, hills, lakes, clouds and birds. There are also two examples of polycrome Rossetti ceramics, representing scenes of a lake and a town.

=== Ferretti ===
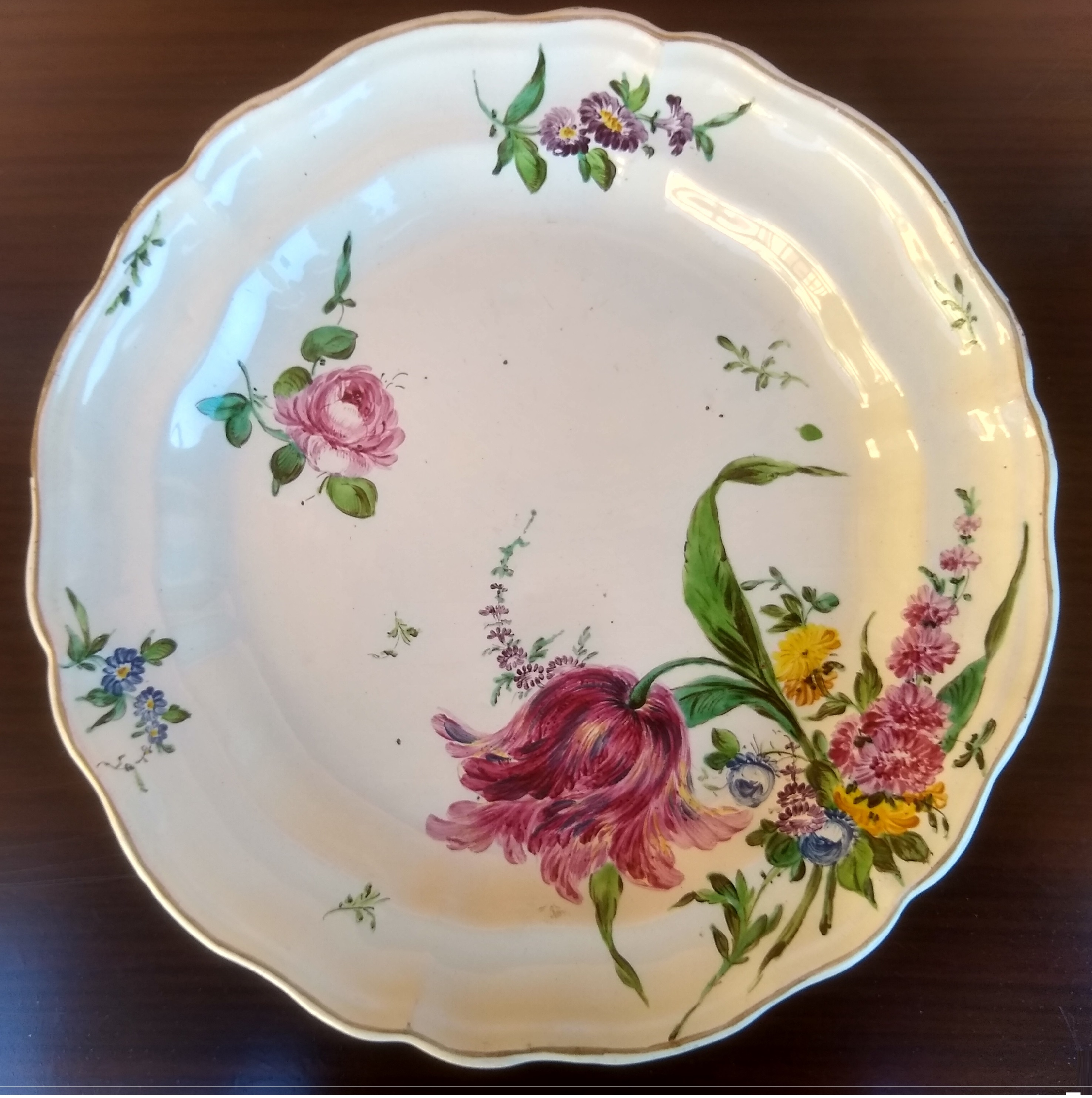
Maiolica dish with flower decoration, overglaze firing, Ferretti factory, 1770-75

The Ferretti factory was active in Lodi in the 18th century until the beginning of the 19th century. At the start of the second half of the eighteenth century, the piccolo fuoco technique was introduced. It is believed that Antonio Ferretti was one of the first to introduce this technique in Italy. The best known decoration of the Ferretti ceramics is the one with naturalistic flowers, with very bright and lively colours, which could be obtained thanks to the piccolo fuoco technique. The most commonly painted flowers were wild flowers, such as forget-me-not, buttercups, Centaurea cyanus, campanula, primroses and dog rose; but also cultivated varieties were represented, such as roses, tulips and carnations. Other decorations included Chinese and Oriental figures, and some fruit decorations, with the technique of the piccolo fuoco; and still lifes with fruit and fish with the technique of gran fuoco

== Museums ==
These are some of the museums where Lodi ceramics are on display

- Museo civico di Lodi
- Victoria and Albert Museum, London
- Musée national Adrien Dubouché a Limoges
- Musée des Arts décoratifs, Strasbourg
- Musée national de Céramique (Sèvres)
- Museo internazionale delle ceramiche in Faenza
- Turin City Museum of Ancient Art in Palazzo Madama, Turin
- Musei del Castello Sforzesco, Sforza Castle, in Milan
- Pinacoteca Ambrosiana, part of Biblioteca Ambrosiana, in Milan.
- Musei di Strada Nuova, in Genoa
- Museo Gianetti, Saronno
- Accademia di Belle Arti Tadini, Lovere

== Gallery ==
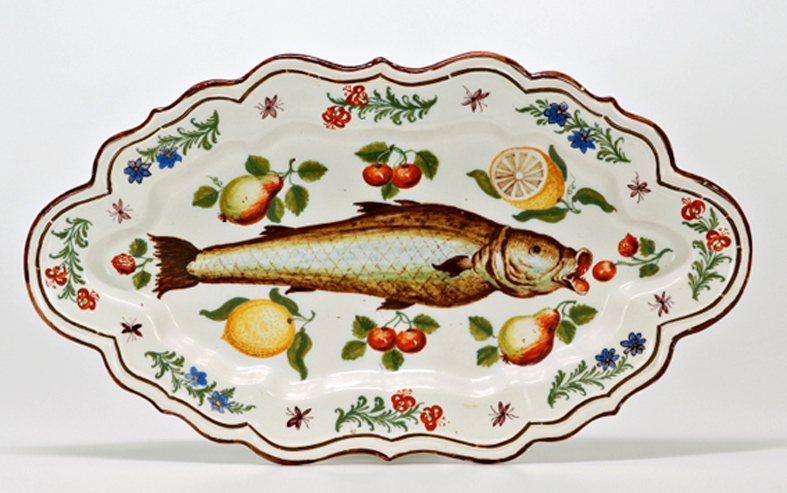
Polychrome maiolica dish with paintings of a fish, flowers and fruit, Lodi, 1751.

== Bibliography ==
- Ferrari, Felice (2003). La ceramica di Lodi [Lodi ceramics] (in Italian). Azzano San Paolo: Bolis Edizioni.
- Gelmini, Maria Laura (1995). "Le fabbriche". Maioliche lodigiane del '700 [Lodi maiolica in the 18th century] (in Italian). Venice: Electa. ISBN 88-435-5402-6.
- Gelmini, Maria Laura (1995). "L'arte ceramica lodigiana". Maioliche lodigiane del '700 [Lodi maiolica in the 18th century] (in Italian). Venice: Electa. ISBN 88-435-5402-6.
- Samarati, Luigi (1995). "La produzione di maiolica nell'economia lodigiana del Seicento e del Settecento". Maioliche lodigiane del '700 [Lodi maiolica in the 18th century] (in Italian). Venice: Electa. ISBN 88-435-5402-6.
- Samarati, Luigi (2003). "Introduzione storico-economica". La ceramica di Lodi [Lodi ceramics] (in Italian). Azzano San Paolo: Bolis Edizioni.
- Cohen, David; Hess, Catherine (1993). Looking at European Ceramics. A guide to technical terms. Los Angeles: The J. Paul Getty Museum. ISBN 0-7141-1734-X.
- Armando Novasconi; Severo Ferrari; Socrate Corvi (1964). La ceramica Lodigiana [Ceramics from Lodi] (in Italian). Lodi: Banca Mutua Popolare Agricola di Lodi.
