= Giorgio Andreoli =

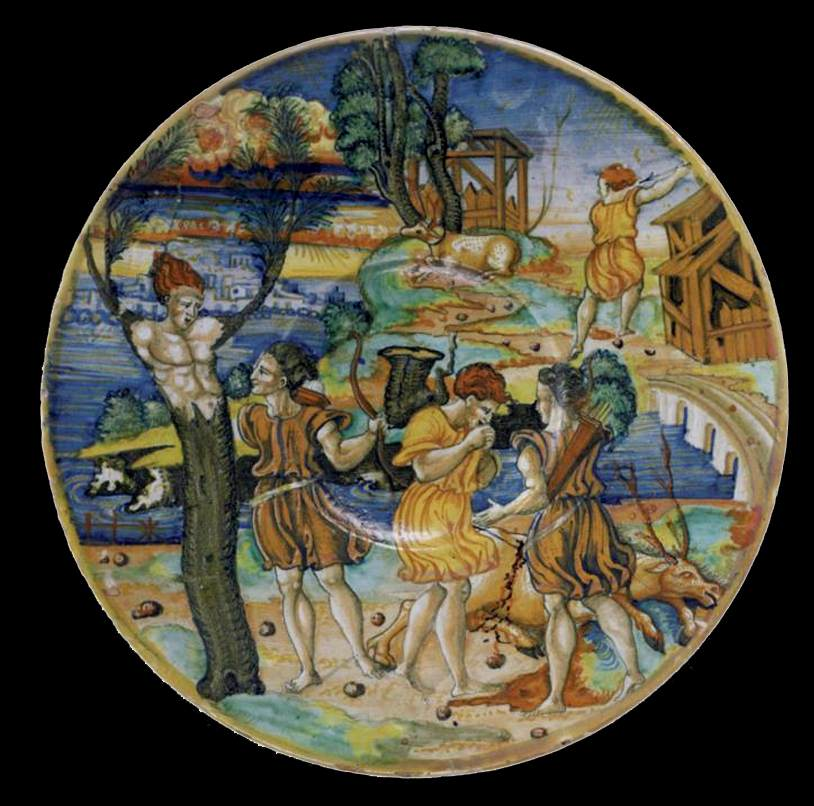
Dish (1525-1530) depicting Cyparissus's metamorphosis lustered by Giorgio Andreoli.

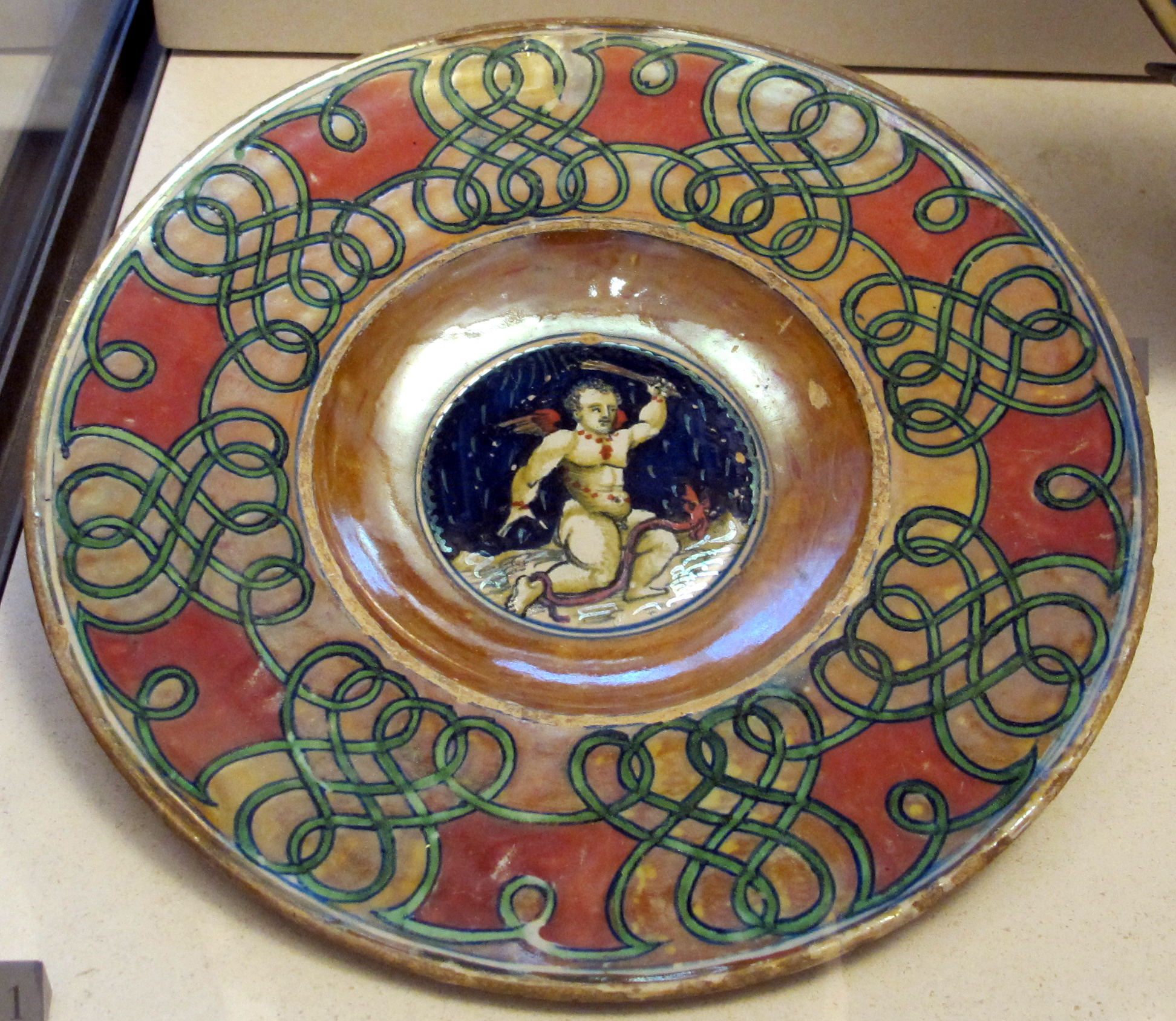
Lustre dish with the characteristic red and gold colours

Giorgio Andreoli (between 1465 and 1470 – 1553), named also Mastro Giorgio Andreoli or Mastro Giorgio, was born in Intra, on Lake Maggiore, and died in Gubbio, where he spent most of his life, in 1555. He is considered to be one of the most important potters of the Italian Renaissance. It was rare for Renaissance potters to achieve fame or notoriety due to the existence of more expensive consumer items such as jewelry, items from antiquity, silver and gold. The most expensive maiolica did not fetch a price that rivalled the others and were not held in as high regard. However, Giorgio Andreoli was famous in his day due to his invention of a particular kind of lusterware (lustro), using red and gold especially. This lustre-firing technique evolved from its use in Deruta around 1460, transitioning from a golden sheen to a golden-reddish gloss in Gubbio during the 1490s.

Not all works fired with his lustre were designed by him. Many potters from neighboring cities, like Francesco Xanto Avelli of Urbino, brought their work to him to be fired. He was assisted in his work by his brothers Salimbene and Giovanni, and after his death, it was continued by his sons.

== Biography ==
Giorgio was the son of Pietro Andreoli. During his youth he lived in Pavia, so in some notarial acts he was referred to as “son of Pietro da Pavia." Giorgio later moved to Gubbio in the duchy of Urbino, where he was reported to have been active from 1495. He worked with his brothers, Giovanni and Salimbene, who were also potters.

In 1498, he became a citizen of Gubbio and, in 1518, invented his remarkable lustre, the chief characteristics of which are its beautiful gold and carmine colours. Good examples of his majolica may be found in the local museums of Gubbio, Urbino, Arezzo, and elsewhere in Italy, and also in the principal museums of decorative art in Europe, such as Berlin, Vienna, Paris, and South Kensington.

In Gubbio, he produced lustreware by applying to already-fired ceramics metallic paints that produced iridescent effects after re-firing. This technique was not completely unknown; in fact, it was used by the Persians as early as the 8th century and later revived in Hispano-Moorish faience, but Andreoli's merit was that he succeeded in perfecting it.

The success of his work was such that from other localities known for ceramics, such as Faenza, Urbino, and Pesaro, they sent high-quality pieces to be worked and decorated by Andreoli, who, for a time, was also helped in his work by his sons Vincenzo and Ubaldo.

While in the early days, the workshop produced mainly tableware, later, the production range widened, and Andreoli also worked as a pictorial decorator, as appears in the 1501 statuette of St. Sebastian, preserved in the Victoria and Albert Museum in London.

== Gallery ==
Circle of Maestro Giorgio Andreoli, "Charger Depicting the Three Graces," ca. 1525, Cleveland Museum of Art, Cleveland, USA.

Workshop of Giorgio Andreoli, "Armorial dish: Supper at the House of Simon the Pharisee," 1528, The Metropolitan Museum of Art, New York City.

Giorgio Andreoli, "Dish with a putto (winged infant)," ca. 1525-1530, Gardiner Museum of Ceramic Art, Toronto.

Bowl with infant St. John the Baptist, featuring pear detailing around the edges. Workshop of Maestro Giorgio Andreoli, 1531, Gubbio, Gardiner Museum of Ceramic Art, Toronto.

Dish with the story of Icarus. Painted by Francesco Xanto Aveli, Urbino; lustred in the workshop of Maestro Giorgio Andreoli, ca. 1530, Gubbio, Gardiner Museum of Ceramic Art, Toronto.

Dish with the story of Tydeus and Polynices. Painting attributed to Sforza di Marcantonio, Urbino; lustred in the workshop of Maestro Giorgio Andreoli, 1539, Gubbio, Gardiner Museum of Ceramic Art, Toronto.
