= Julius Dressler =

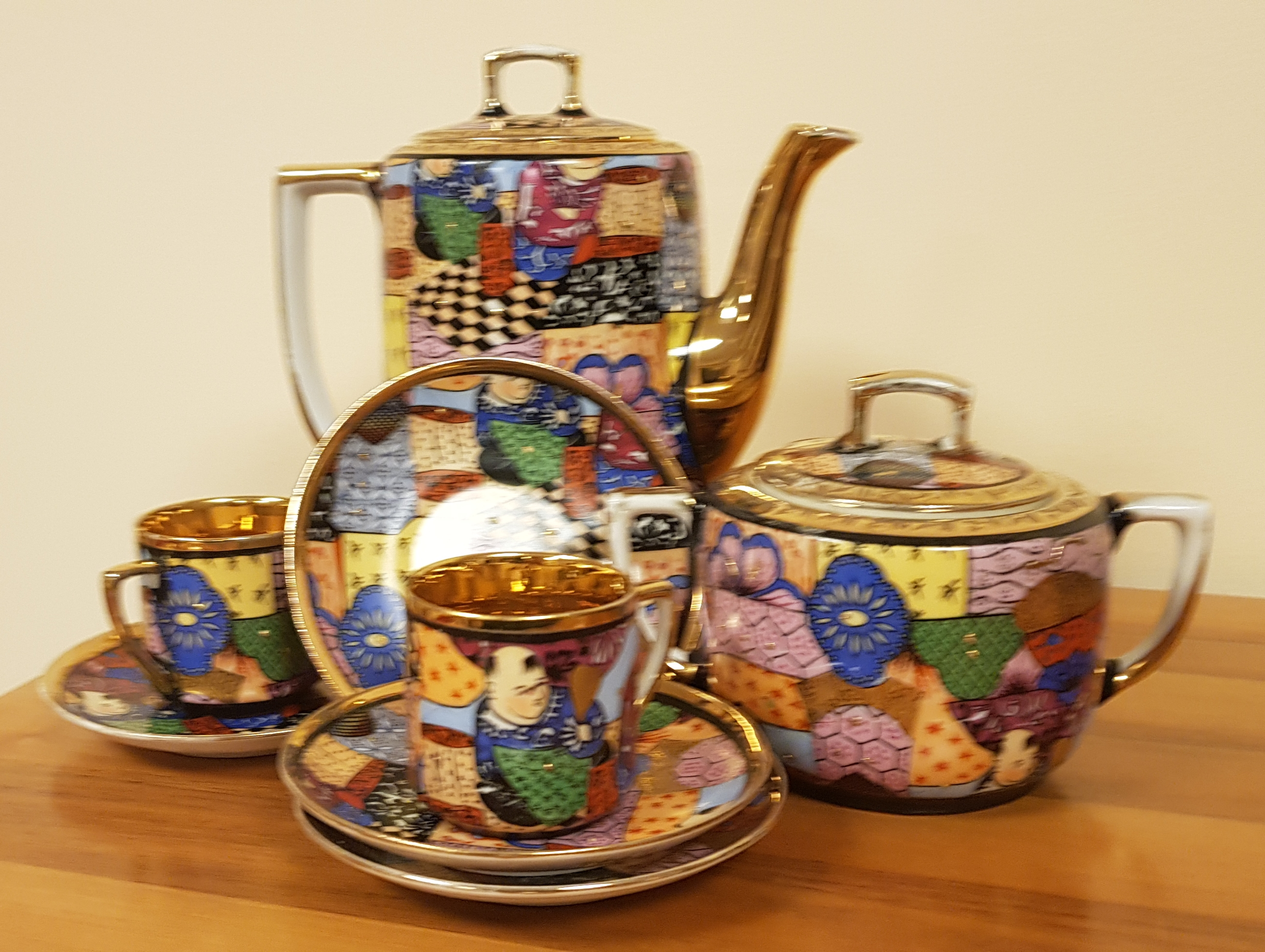

Julius Dressler was a noted Bohemian ceramics manufacturing company that operated from the late 19th century until the end of World War II.

Founded by Julius Dressler in the 1880s in Biela, part of (Tetschen-)Bodenbach in Northern Bohemia, the company produced high-quality decorative faience, maiolica, and porcelain ware. Dressler gained international renown for the ceramics it produced in the early 1900s in the Art Nouveau style, also known as "Jugendstil" or "Secessionist" ware.

Ca. 1920 the Dressler company became part of EPIAG, a consortium of independent companies established in 1918 to promote Bohemian ceramics.

The Dressler company closed at the end of World War II, either in 1944 or 1945.
