= Maiolica =

Renaissance-era Italian tin-glazed pottery

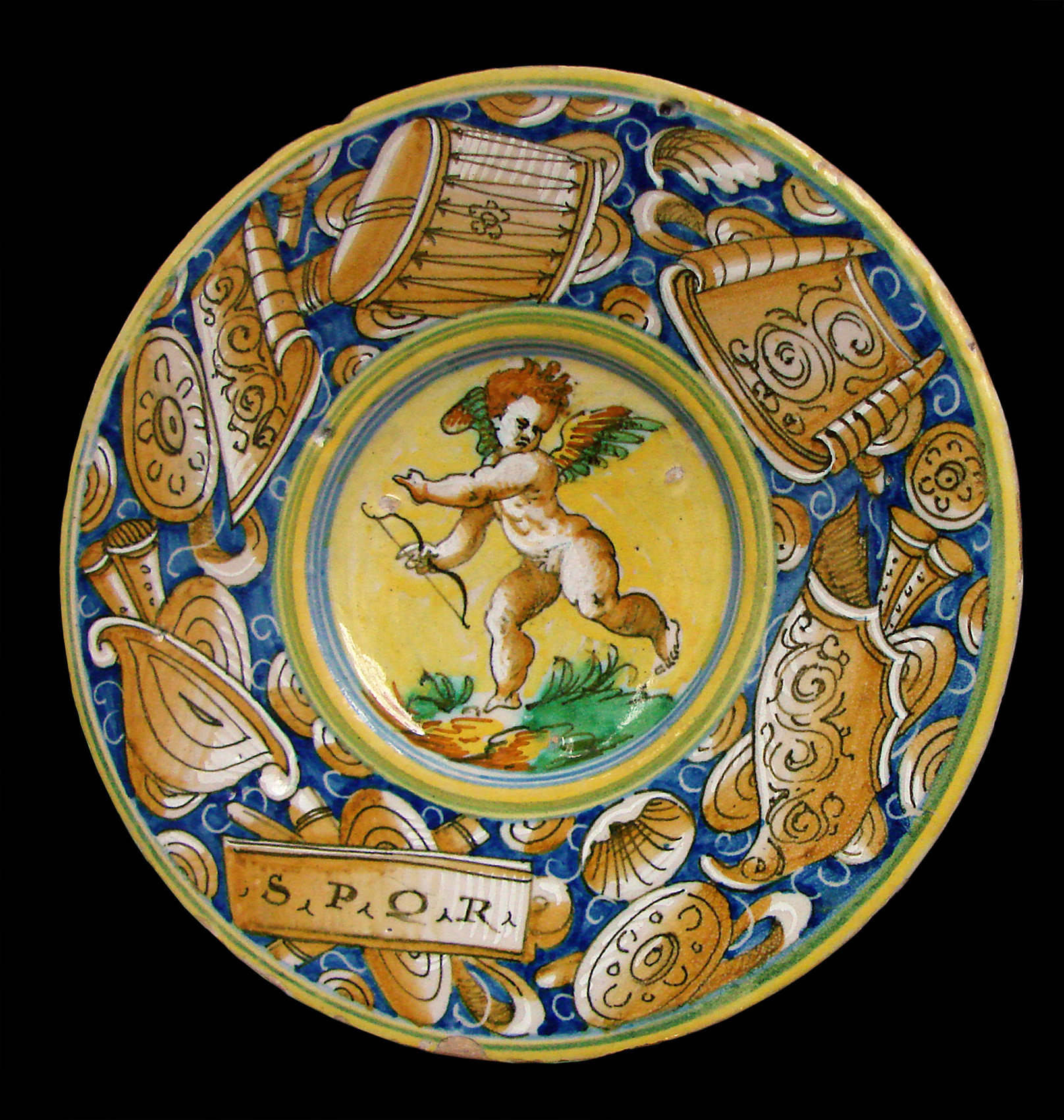
Istoriato decoration on a plate from Castel Durante, c. 1550–1570 (Musée des Beaux-Arts de Lille)

Maiolica /maɪˈɒlɪkə/, or majolica, is tin-glazed pottery decorated in colours on a white background. The most renowned maiolica is from the Renaissance period. These works were known as istoriato wares ("painted with stories") when depicting historical and mythical scenes. Its origins date from painted Hispano-Moresque ware from Spain, developing the styles of Al-Andalus. By the late 15th century, multiple locations were producing sophisticated pieces for a luxury market. In Italy, the production arose in the northern and central regions. In France, maiolica developed as faience, in the Netherlands and England as delftware (Delft Blue), and in Spain as talavera. In English, the spelling was anglicised to majolica (/məˈdʒɒlɪkə/, /maɪˈɒlɪkə/).

== Name ==
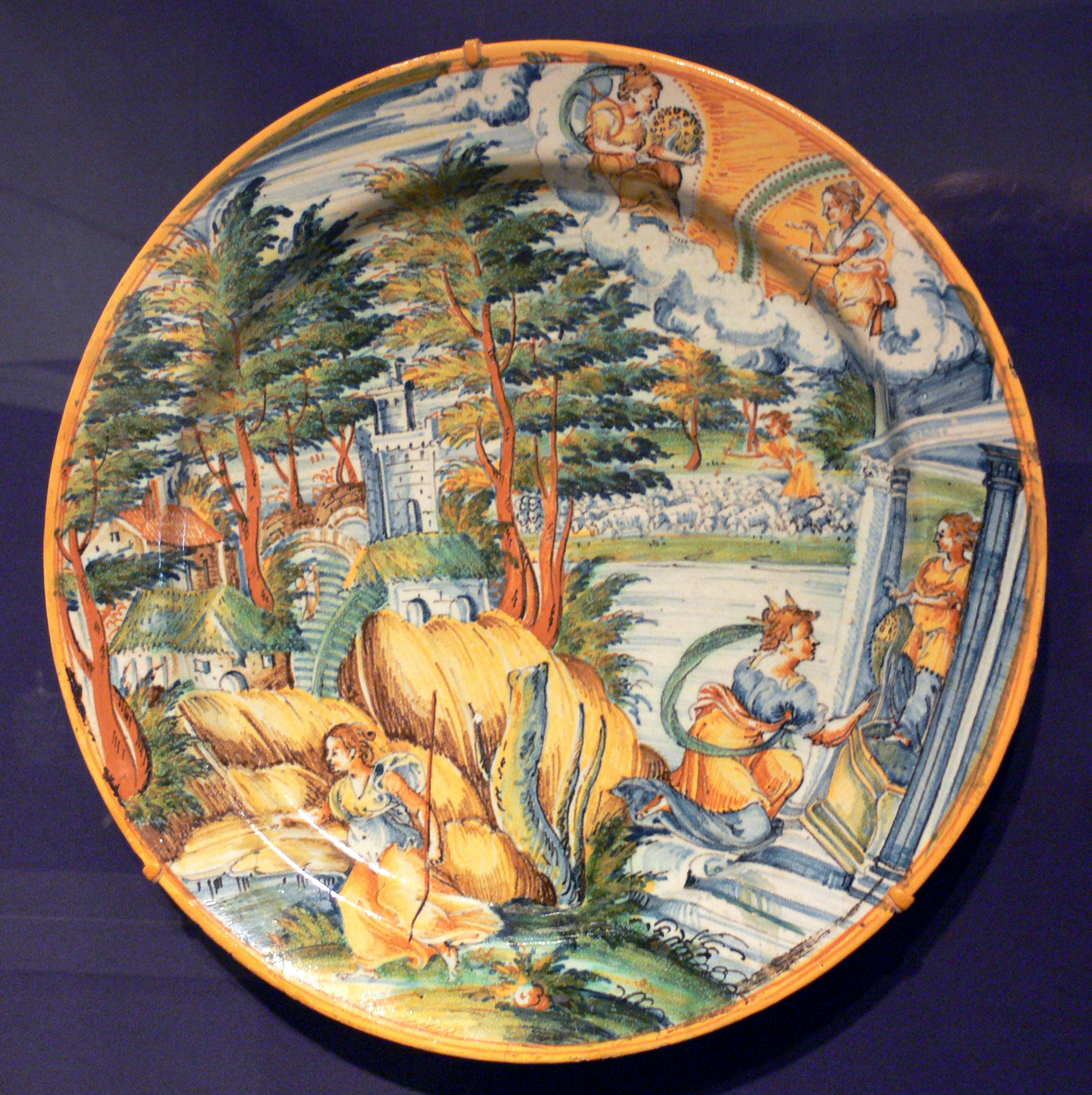
Istoriato charger, Faenza, c. 1555 (Dallas Museum of Art)

The name is thought to come from the medieval Italian word for Mallorca, an island on the route for ships bringing Hispano-Moresque wares from Valencia to Italy. Moorish potters from Mallorca are reputed to have worked in Sicily, and it has been suggested that their wares reached the Italian mainland from Caltagirone. An alternative explanation of the name is that it comes from the Spanish term obra de Málaga, denoting "[imported] wares from Málaga", or obra de mélequa, the Spanish name for lustre.

In the 15th century, the term maiolica referred solely to lustreware, including both Italian-made and Spanish imports, and tin-glaze wares were known as bianchi (whiteware). By 1875, the term was in use describing ceramics made in Italy, lustred or not, of tin-glazed earthenware. With the Spanish conquest of the Aztec Empire, tin-glazed maiolica wares came to be produced in the Valley of Mexico as early as 1540, at first in imitation of tin-glazed pottery imported from Seville. Mexican maiolica is known famously as 'Talavera'.

"By a convenient extension and limitation the name may be applied to all tin-glazed ware, of whatever nationality, made in the Italian tradition ... the name faïence (or the synonymous English 'delftware') being reserved for the later wares of the 17th Century onwards, either in original styles (as in the case of the French) or, more frequently, in the Dutch-Chinese (Delftware) tradition." The term "maiolica" is sometimes applied to modern tin-glazed ware made by studio potters.

== Tin-glazed earthenware ==
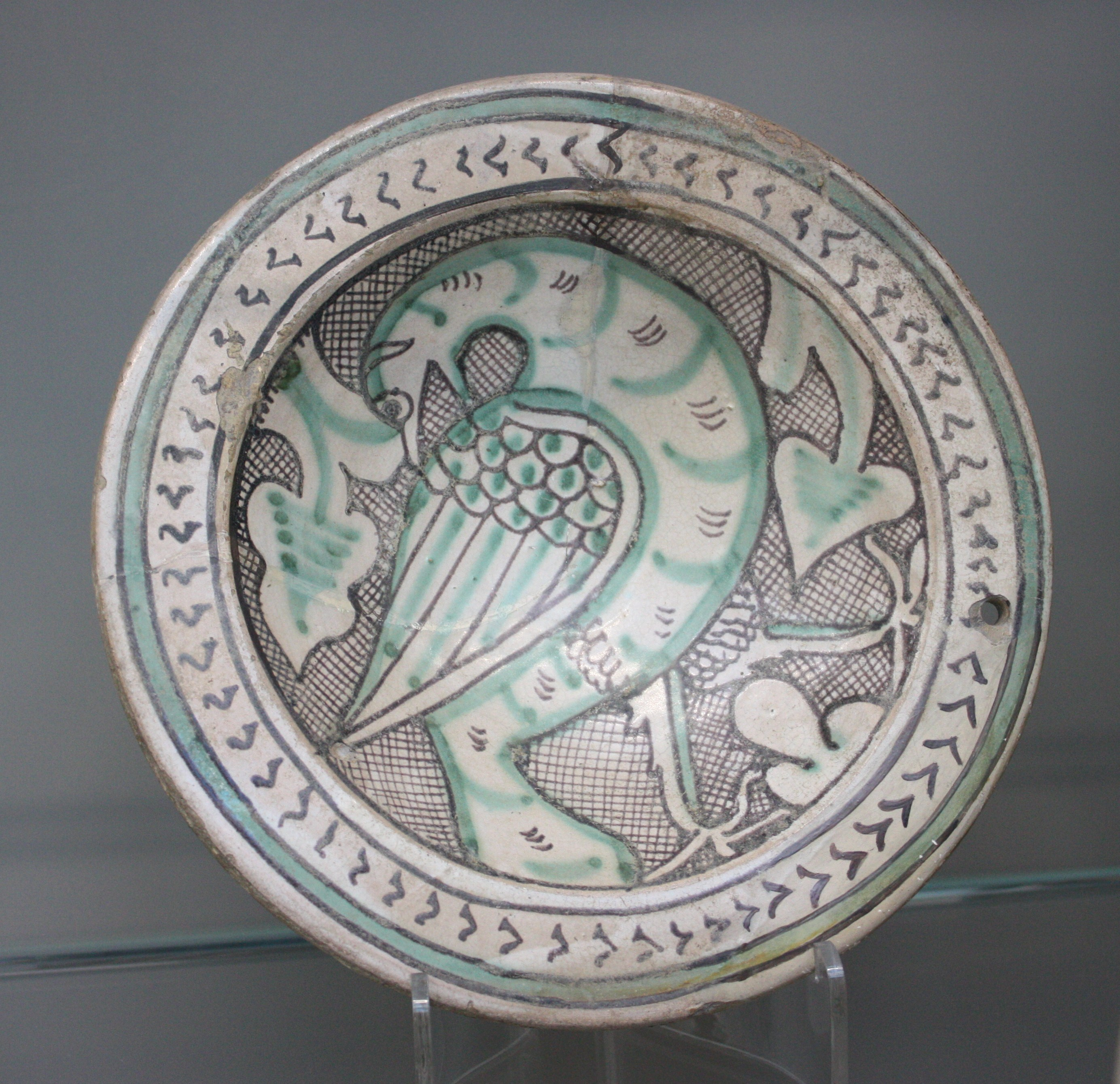
Dish with bird, in Islamic-derived style, Orvieto, c. 1270–1330 (Victoria and Albert Museum)

Tin glazing creates a white, opaque surface for painting. The colours are applied as metallic oxides or as fritted underglazes to the unfired glaze, which absorbs pigment like fresco, making errors impossible to fix but preserving the brilliant colours. Sometimes the surface is covered with a second glaze (called coperta by the Italians) that lends greater shine and brilliance to the wares. In the case of lustred wares, a further oxygen-starved firing at a lower temperature is required. Kilns required wood as well as suitable clay. Glaze was made from sand, wine lees, lead compounds, and tin compounds. Tin-glazed earthenware is frequently prone to flaking and somewhat delicate.

Analysis of samples of Italian maiolica pottery from the Middle Ages has indicated that tin was not always a component of the glaze, whose chemical composition varied.

The fifteenth-century wares that initiated maiolica as an art form were the product of an evolution in which medieval lead-glazed earthenwares were improved by the addition of tin oxides under the influence of Islamic wares imported through Sicily. Such archaic wares are sometimes called "proto-maiolica". During the later fourteenth century, the limited palette of colours for earthenware decorated with coloured lead glazes (no added tin oxide) was expanded from the traditional manganese purple and copper green to include cobalt blue, antimony yellow and iron-oxide orange. Sgraffito wares were also produced, in which the white tin-oxide glaze was scratched through to produce a design from the revealed body of the ware. Scrap sgraffito ware excavated from kilns in Bacchereto, Montelupo, and Florence show that such wares were produced more widely than at Perugia and Città di Castello, the places to which they have been traditionally attributed.

== History of production ==
Maiolica ceramics was a chance discovery by the Arabs when attempting to create a porcelain similar to that made in China with kaolin. The first maiolica were made with a yellowish terracotta, covered with enamel composed of a layer of lead-glazed paint mixed with quartz powder. The majolicas produced by Islamic peoples, in their initial stage, were decorated with pigments composed of cobalt oxide (blue) and copper or manganese, depending on whether a green or brown colour was desired: the so-called cerámica verde y manganeso (green and manganese ceramics, in Spanish). This art of glazing first spread through North Africa and was later adopted by the Arabs of Spain in the so-called Hispano-Moresque ware.

Refined production of tin-glazed earthenwares made for more than local needs was concentrated in central Italy from the later thirteenth century, especially in the contada of Florence. The Della Robbia family of Florentine sculptors also adopted the medium. The city itself declined in importance as a centre of maiolica production in the second half of the fifteenth century, perhaps because of local deforestation, and manufacture was scattered among small communes, and, after the mid-fifteenth century, at Faenza.

Potters from Montelupo set up the potteries at Cafaggiolo. In 1490, twenty-three master potters of Montelupo agreed to sell the year's production to Francesco Antinori of Florence; Montelupo provided the experienced potters who were set up in 1495 at the Villa Medicea di Cafaggiolo by its Medici owners.

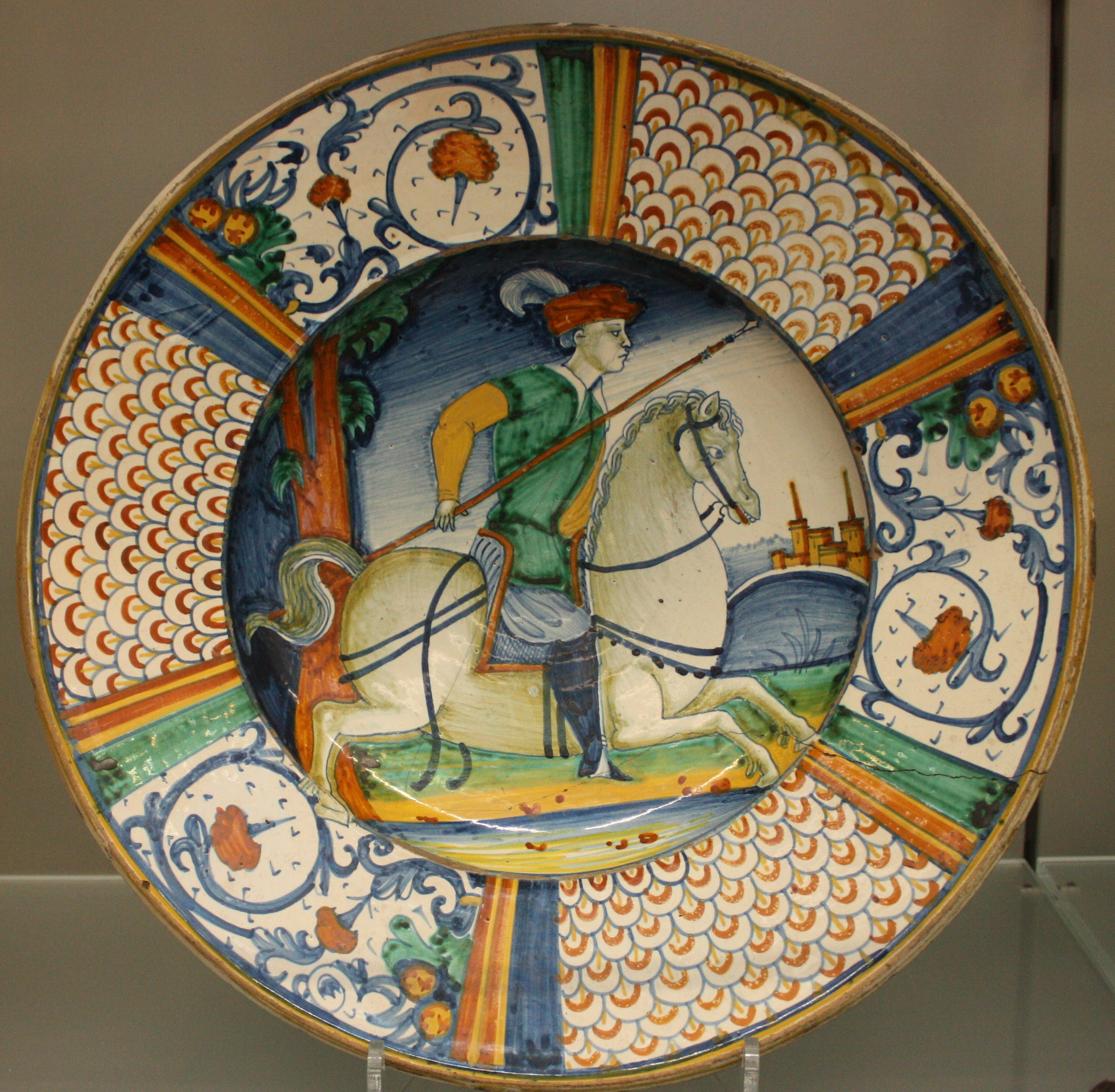
Deruta ware dish, 2nd quarter of the 16th century, shows the full range of glaze colors (Victoria and Albert Museum)

In the fifteenth century, Florentine wares spurred the production of maiolica at Arezzo and Siena. Italian maiolica reached an astonishing degree of perfection in this period. In Romagna, Faenza, which gave its name to faience, produced fine maiolica from the early fifteenth century; it was the only significant city in which the ceramic production industry became a major part of the economy. Bologna produced lead-glazed wares for export. Orvieto and Deruta both produced maioliche in the fifteenth century.

In the sixteenth century, maiolica production was established at Castel Durante, Urbino, Gubbio and Pesaro. The early sixteenth century saw the development of istoriato wares on which historical and mythical scenes were painted in great detail. The State Museum of Medieval and Modern Art in Arezzo claims to have Italy's largest collection of istoriato wares. Istoriato wares are also well represented in the British Museum, London.

Some maiolica was produced as far north as Padua, Venice and Turin and as far south as Palermo and Caltagirone in Sicily, and Laterza in Apulia. In the seventeenth century, Savona began to be a prominent place of manufacture.

The variety of styles that arose in the sixteenth century defies classification. Goldthwaite notes that Paride Berardi's morphology of Pesaro maioliche comprises four styles in 20 sub-groups; Tiziano Mannoni categorized Ligurian wares in four types, eight sub-categories, and 36 further divisions; Galeazzo Cora's morphology of Montelupo's production is in 19 groups and 51 categories. The diversity of styles can best be seen in a comparative study of apothecary jars produced between the 15th and 18th centuries. Italian cities encouraged the pottery industry by offering tax relief, citizenship, monopoly rights, and protection from outside imports.

An important mid-sixteenth century document for the techniques of maiolica painting is the treatise of Cipriano Piccolpasso. The work of individual sixteenth-century masters like Nicola da Urbino, Francesco Xanto Avelli, Guido Durantino and Orazio Fontana of Urbino, Mastro Giorgio of Gubbio, and Maestro Domenigo of Venice has been noted. Gubbio lustre used greenish yellow, strawberry pink, and ruby red colours.

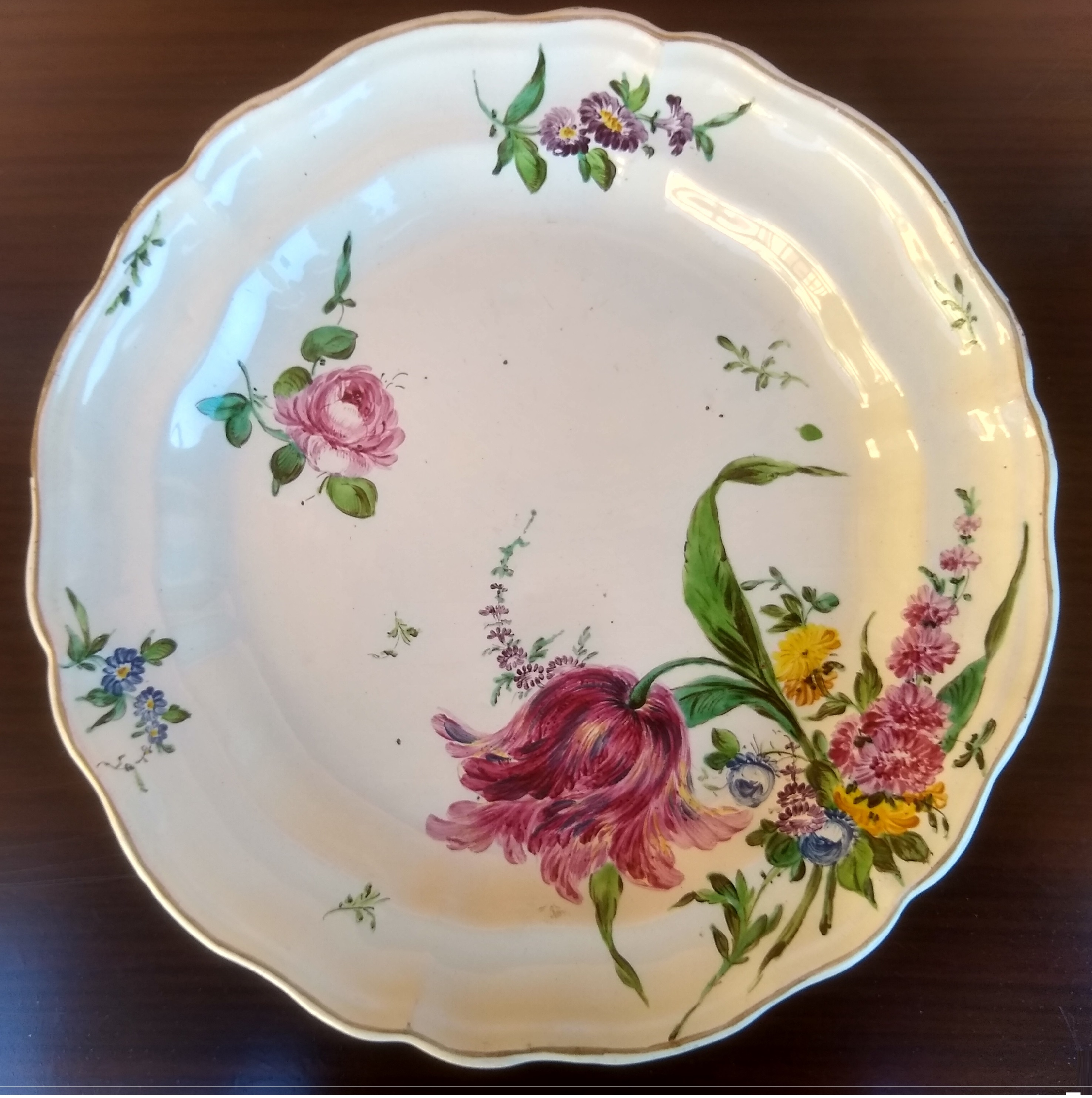
Maiolica dish with naturalistic flower overglaze decoration, Lodi, Italy, Ferretti factory, 1770-75

The tradition of fine maiolica came under increasing competition in the 18th century, mainly from porcelain and white earthenware. But the 18th century is not a period of relentless decline. To face the competition from porcelain and its vibrant colours, the process of third firing (piccolo fuoco) was introduced, initially in North-West Europe around the mid of century. After the traditional two firings at 950 °C, the vitrified glaze was painted with colours that would have degraded at such high temperatures and was fired a third time at a lower temperature, about 600-650 °C. New vibrant colours were thus introduced, particularly red and various shades of pink obtained from gold chloride. It is believed that one of the first to introduce this technique in Italy was Ferretti in Lodi, in northern Italy. Lodi maiolica had already reached high quality in the second quarter of the 18th century. With the introduction of the third firing technique and increasing interest in botany and scientific observation, a refined production of maiolica decorated with naturalistic flowers was developed.

=== Contemporary production ===
Maiolica continues to be produced in contemporary times in several historic Italian centres, where traditional techniques have been preserved through the work of workshops, ceramic artists, and modellers. Towns such as Faenza, Deruta, Urbino, Montelupo Fiorentino, and Caltagirone remain active in the production of tin-glazed earthenware, maintaining historical methods while adapting to modern cultural and economic contexts. The continued use of tin-based glazes and traditional firing processes demonstrates the persistence of maiolica as a living form of artistic craftsmanship in the 21st century.

== Gallery ==
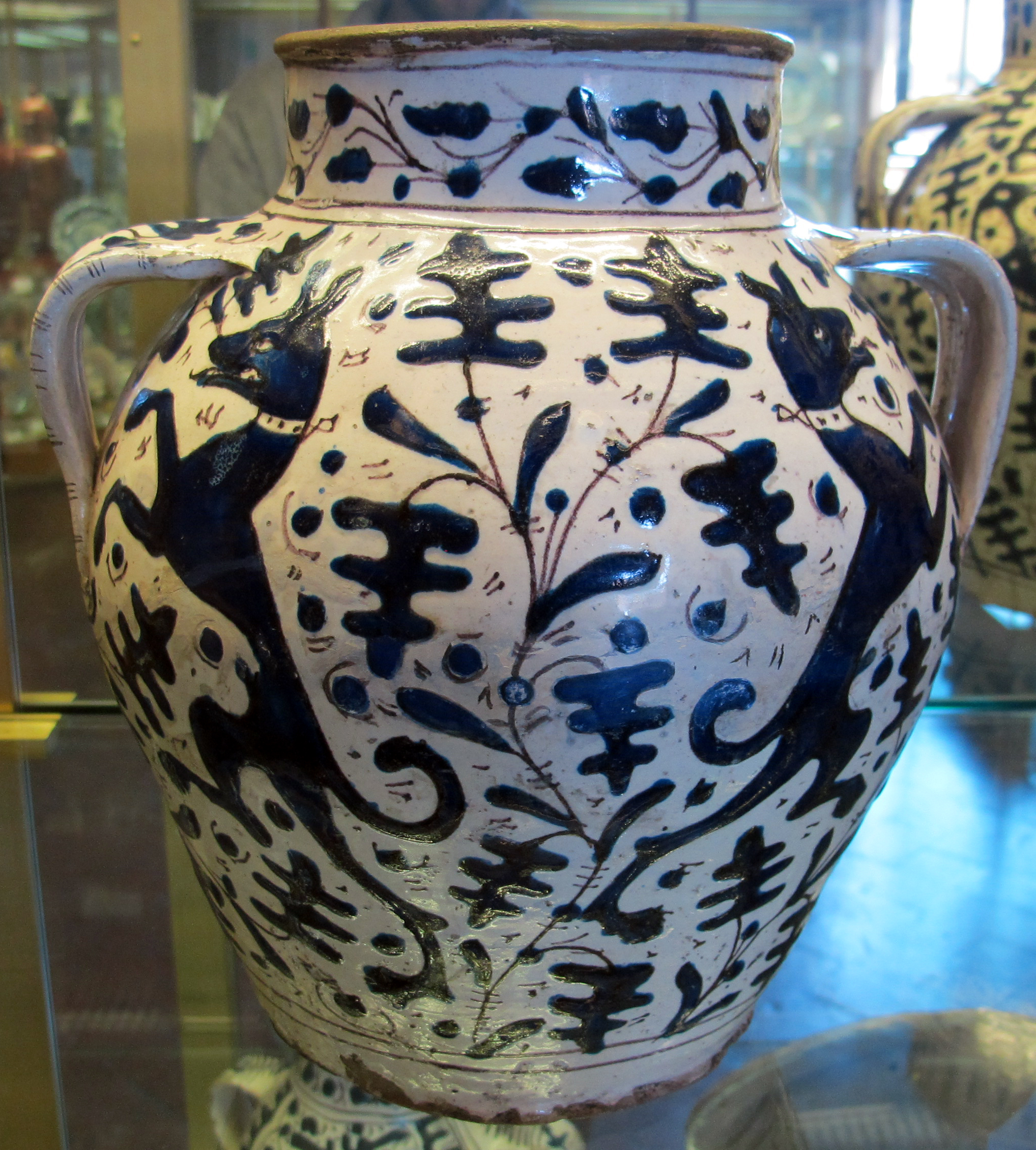
Blue and white vase with oak-leaf and dogs decor, Florence, c. 1400–1450 Bargello Museum

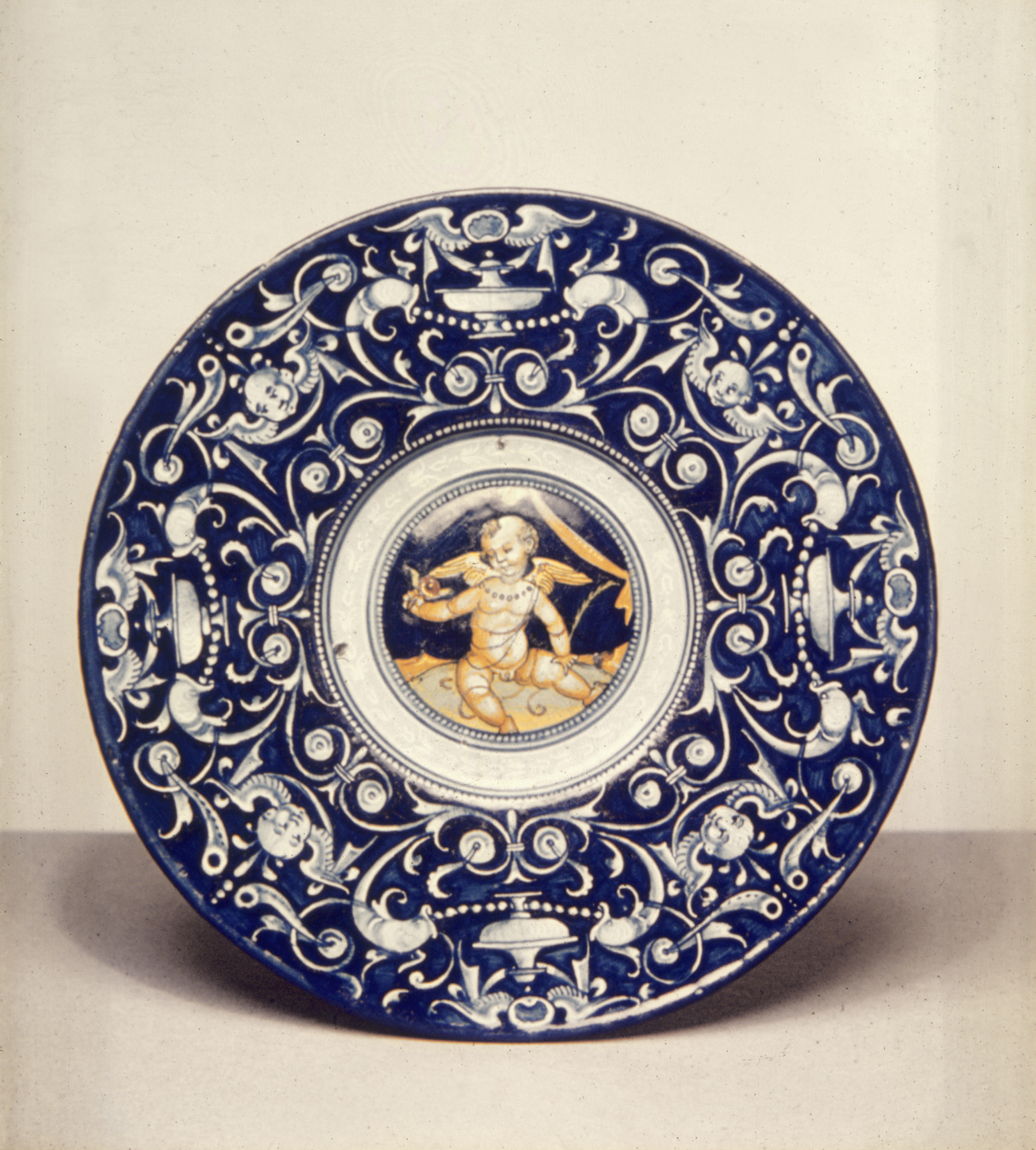
Faenza, Casa Pirota workshop, c. 1510–1530 (Walters Art Museum)

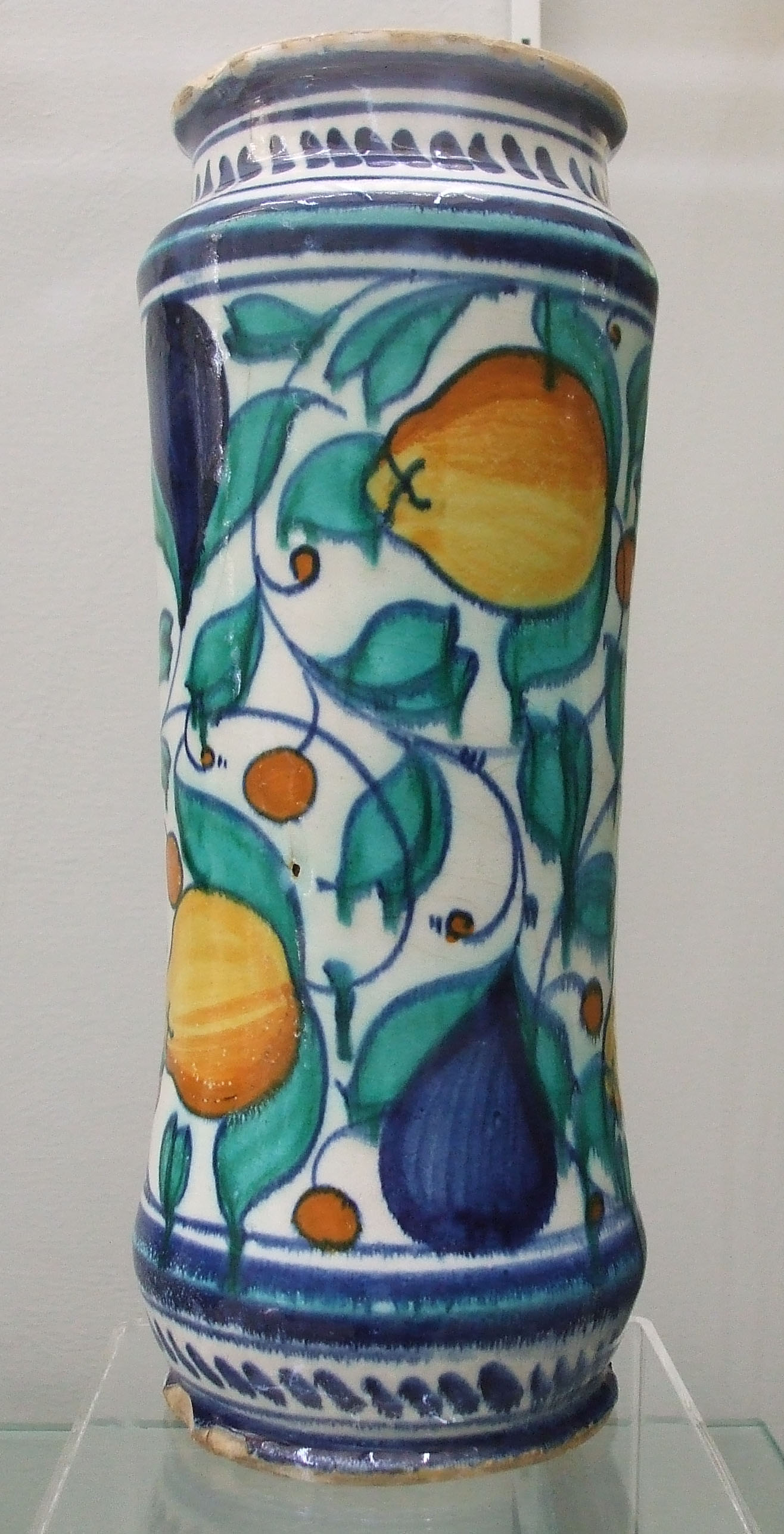
An albarello (drug jar) from Venice or Castel Durante, 16th century. Around 30 cm high. Decorated in cobalt blue, copper green, antimony yellow, and yellow ochre. Burrell Collection

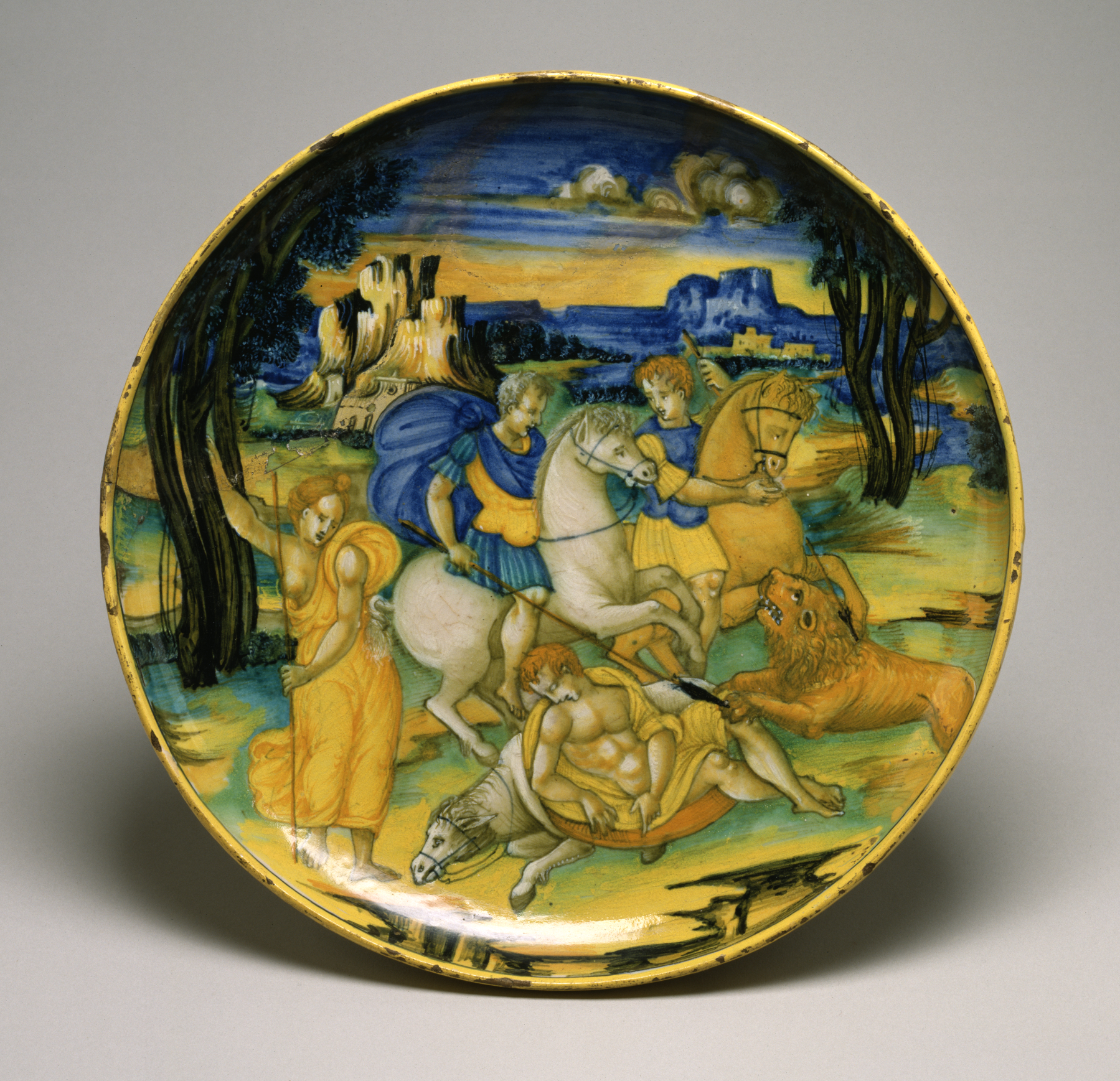
Faenza, istoriato ware by Baldassare Manara, after Giovanni Antonio da Brescia, c. 1520–1547 (Walters Art Museum)

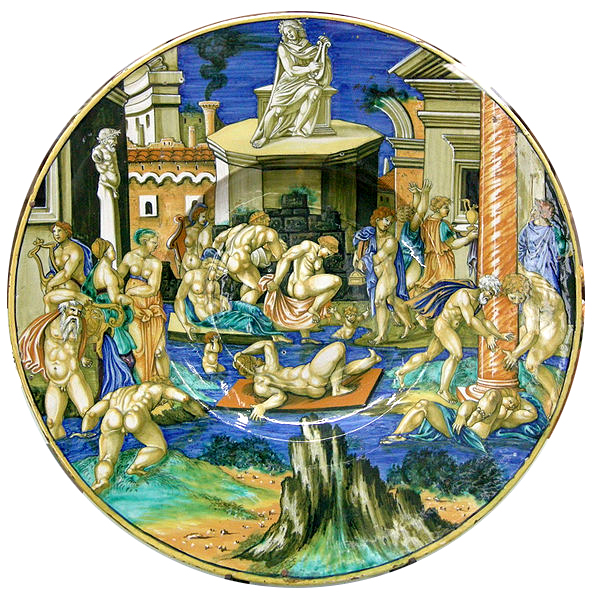
The Tiber in Flood, Francesco Xanto Avelli, Maiolica dish, 1531

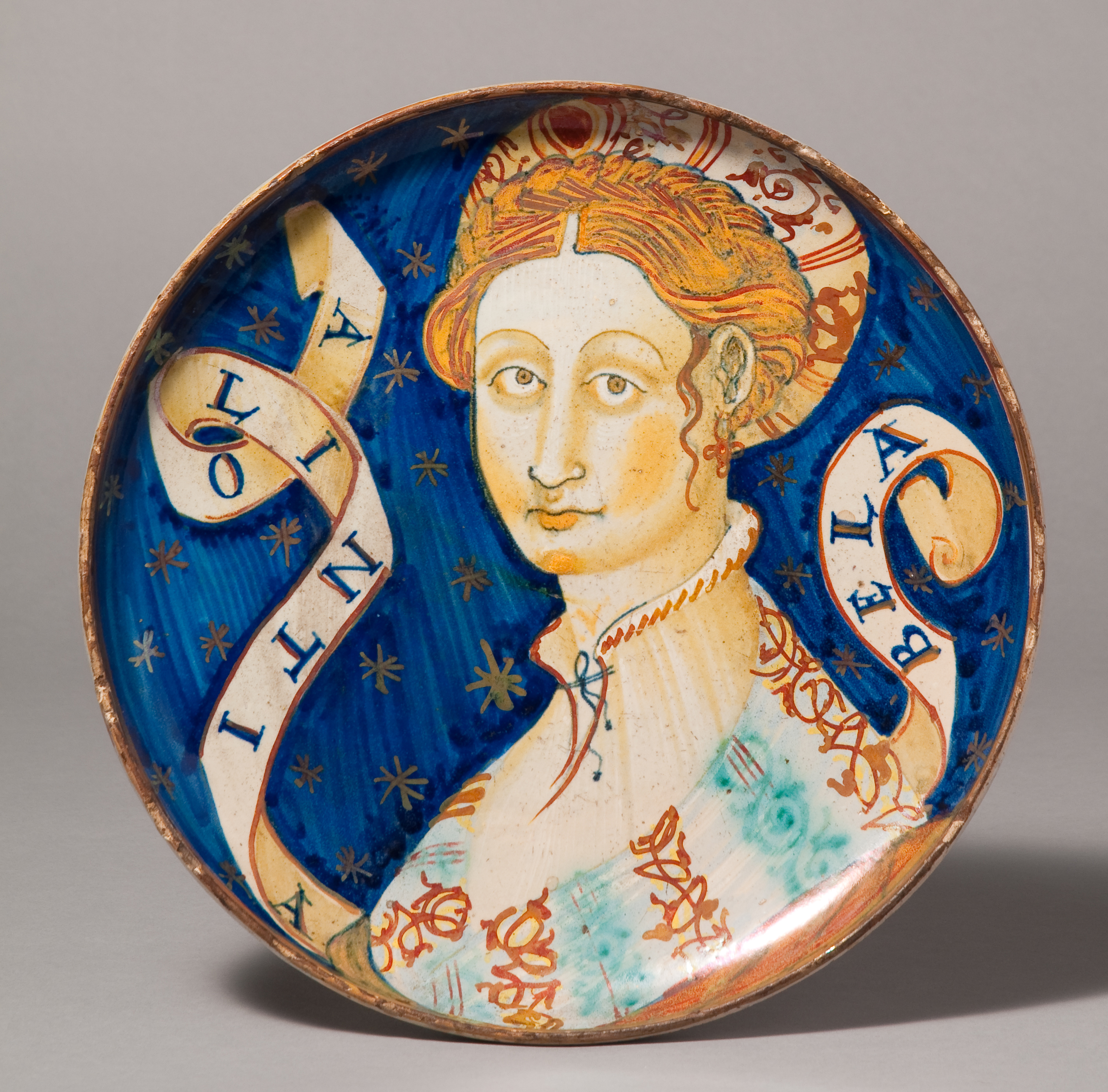
Maiolica dish, c. 1537 at Waddesdon Manor

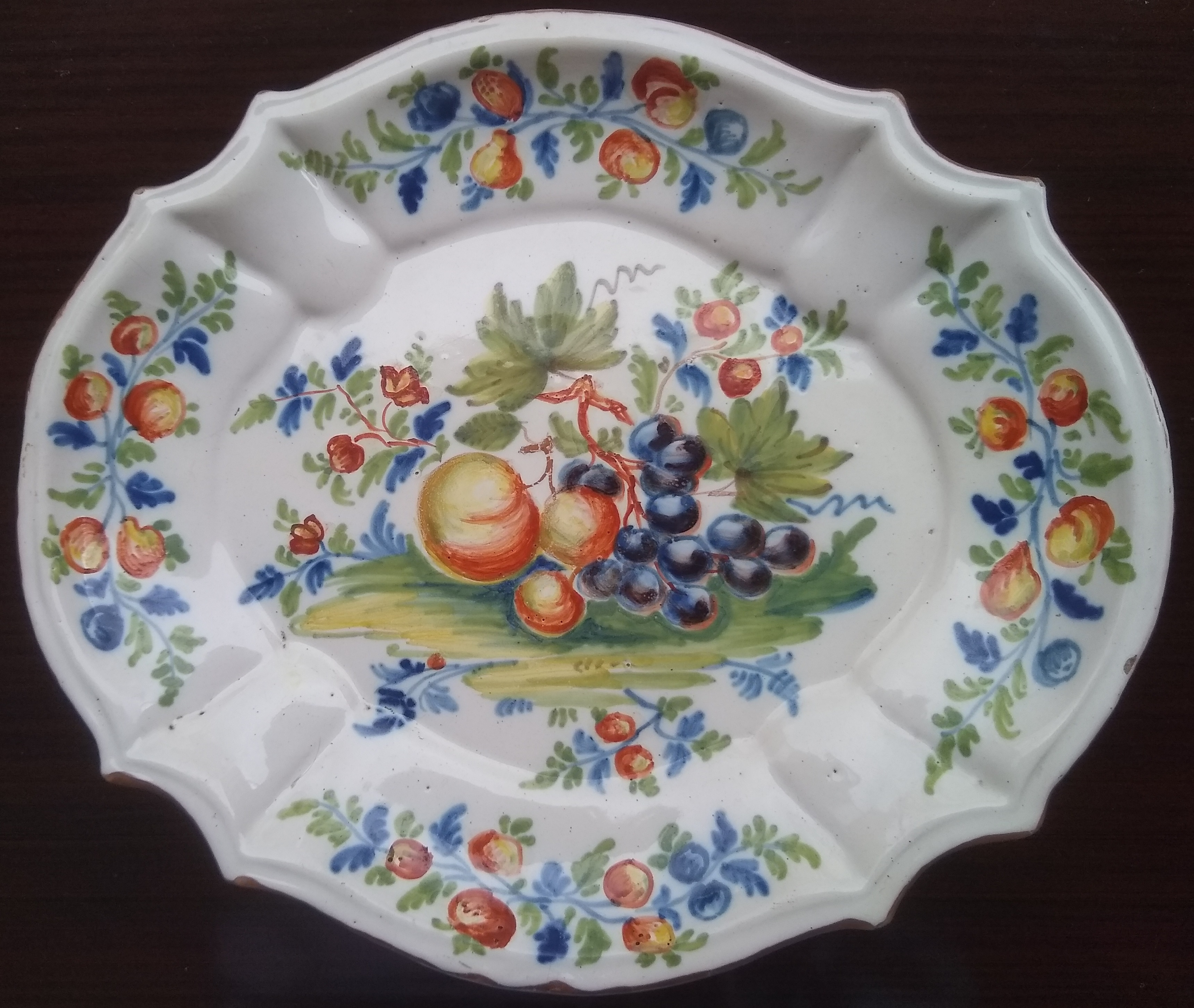
Ceramic dish from Lodi, Italy, with fruit decoration, Coppellotti factory, c. 1740

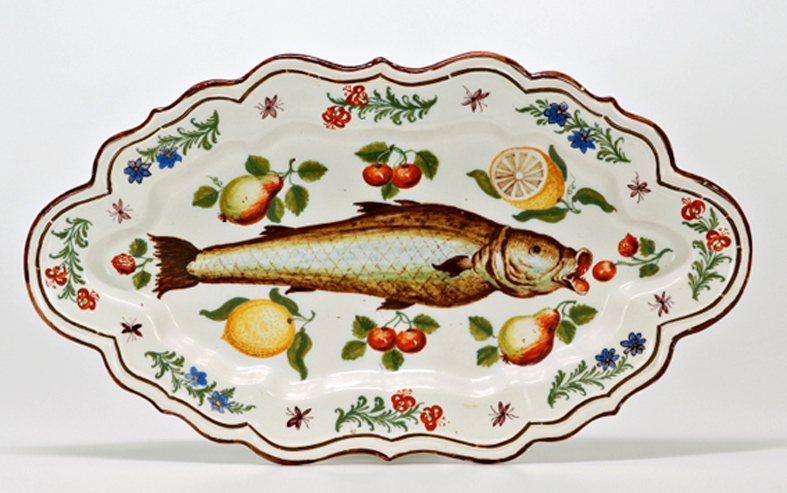
Polychrome majolica dish with paintings of a fish, flowers, and fruit, Lodi, Italy, 1751

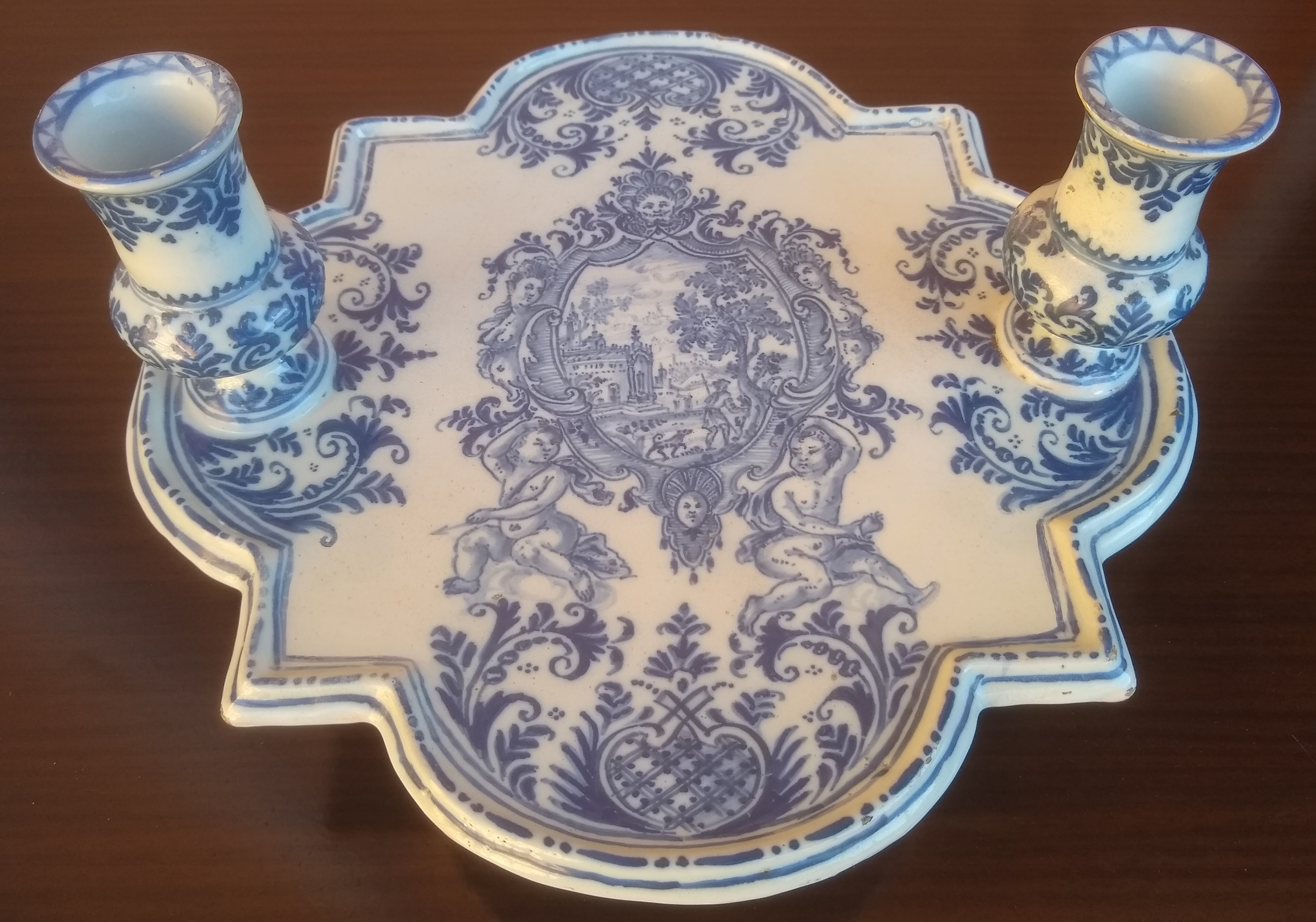
Maiolica stand produced in Lodi, Italy, Coppellotti factory, 18th century

== See also ==
- Francesco Xanto Avelli
- Manises
- Nicola da Urbino
- Nove Ware
- Royal Factory of La Moncloa (Spain)
- Talavera de la Reina pottery (Spain)
- Talavera, Mexican maiolica
- Tin-glazed pottery
- Lodi ceramics
- Faenza ceramics
- Deruta ceramics

== Bibliography ==
- Caiger-Smith, Alan, Tin-Glaze Pottery in Europe and the Islamic World: The Tradition of 1000 Years in Maiolica, Faience and Delftware (Faber and Faber, 1973) ISBN 0-571-09349-3
- Cohen, David Harris and Hess, Catherine, A Guide To Looking At Italian Ceramics (J. Paul Getty Museum in association with British Museum Press, 1993)
- Cooper, Emmanuel (1999). Historia de la cerámica (in Spanish). Barcelona: Ceac. ISBN 84-329-8562-7.
- Cora, Galeazzo Storia della Maiolica di Firenze e del Contado. Secoli XIV e XV (Florence:Sassoni) 1973. The standard monograph on the main early centers, published in an extravagant format, now brings over $1200 on the book market.
- Faenza. Journal published since 1914 devoted to maiolica and glazed earthenwares.
- Filipponi, Fernando, Aurelio Anselmo Grue: la maiolica nel Settecento fra Castelli e Atri, Castelli, Verdone Editore, 2015, ISBN 978-88-96868-47-8.
- Filipponi, Fernando, Souvenir d'Arcadia. Ispirazione letteraria, classicismo e nuovi modelli per le arti decorative alla corte di Clemente XI, Torino, Allemandi, 2020, ISBN 9788842225126.
- Honey, W.B., European Ceramic Art (Faber and Faber, 1952)
- Liverani, G. La maiolica Italiana sino alla comparsa della Porcellana Europea A summary of a century's study, largely based on surviving examples.
- Mussachio, Jacqueline, Marvels of Maiolica: Italian Renaissance Ceramics from the Corcoran Gallery of Art (Bunker Hill Publishing, 2004)
- Osterman, Matthias, The New Maiolica: Contemporary Approaches to Colour and Technique (A&C Black/University of Pennsylvania Press, 1999) ISBN 0-7136-4878-3
- Rackham, Bernard. Italian Maiolica (London: Faber and Faber Monographs)
- Solon, Marc L., A history and description of Italian majolica (Cassell and Company Limited, London, 1907)
- Wilson, Timothy, "Ceramic Art of the Italian Renaissance (London) 1987. Bibliography.
- ---, Maiolica: Italian Renaissance Ceramics in the Ashmolean Museum (Ashmolean Handbooks, 1989) ISBN 0-907849-90-3
- Ferrari, Felice (2003). La ceramica di Lodi [Lodi ceramics] (in Italian). Azzano San Paolo: Bolis Edizioni.
- Poole, Julia E. (1997). Italian Maiolica. Fitzwilliam Museum Handbooks. Cambridge, New York, Melbourne: Cambridge University press. ISBN 0521565316.
