= Nove Ware =

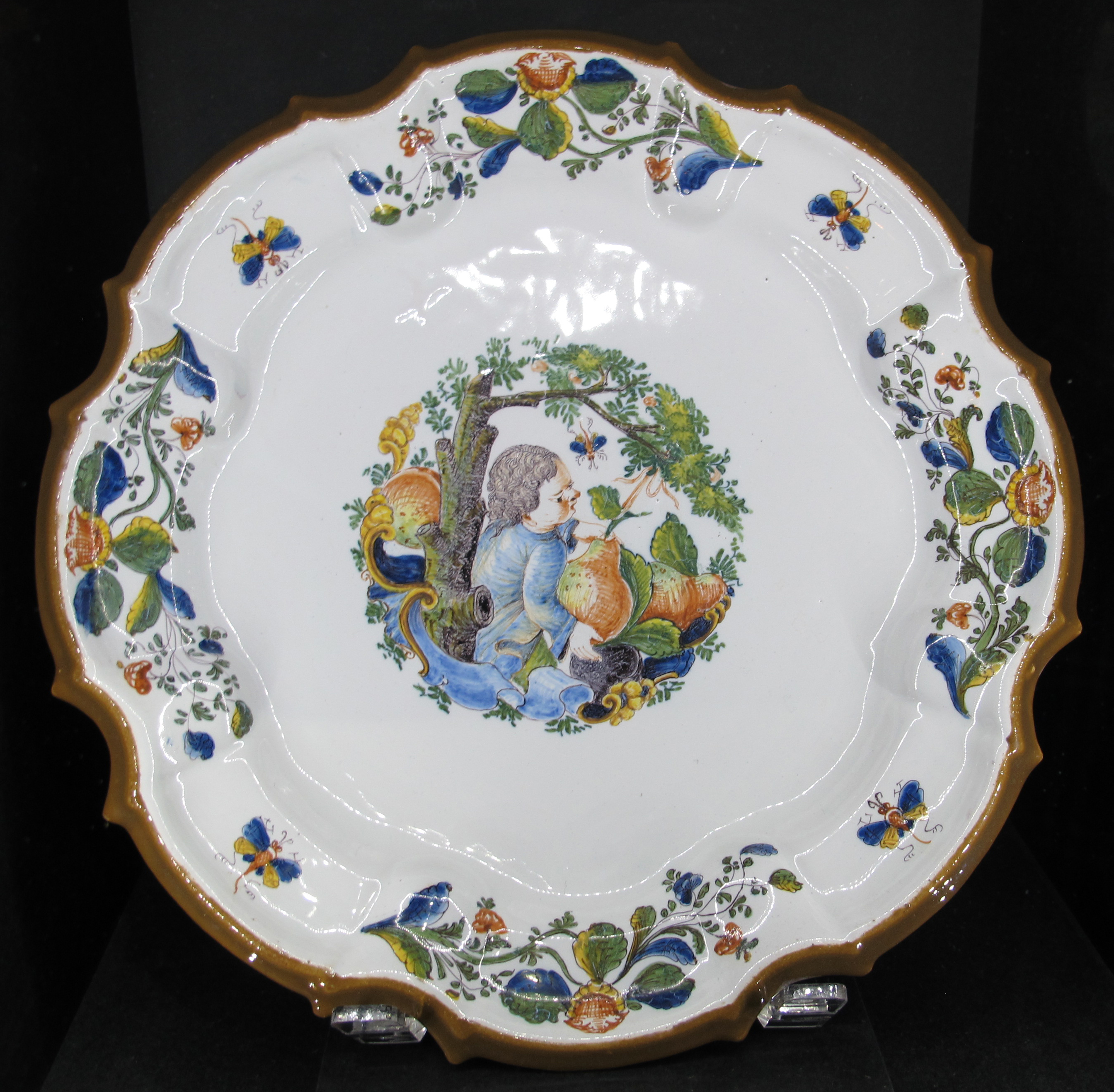
Nove plate, Antonibon factory, c. 1750-70

Nove Ware is a type of maiolica, or tin-glazed earthenware. It was made in Nove, Italy, in the 18th century, mainly in a factory founded by Giovanni Battista Antonibon in 1728. Near the end of the 18th century the factory became associated with another factory, in nearby Bassano, where majolica was produced in the 16th century. Nove ware was fashioned in the Rococo style common in the 18th century, with an emphasis on light, decorative works that conformed to a sense of stylistic elegance, as opposed to the ebullient style of the baroque.
