= Guido Fontana =

Italian painter

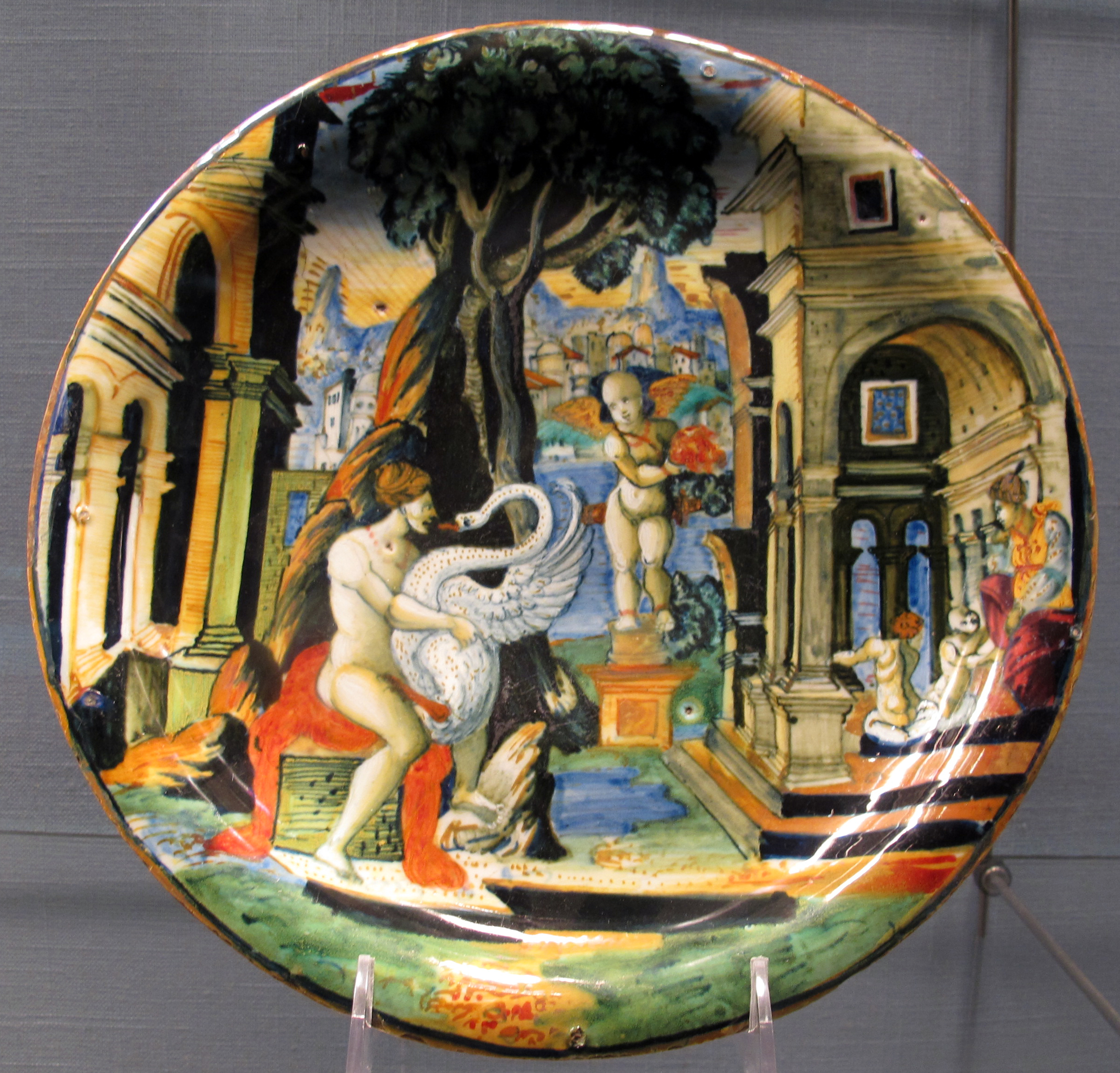
Tin-glazed maiolica plate with Leda and the Swan

Guido Fontana (1490 – 1576) was an Italian maiolica maker and the father of Orazio Fontana.

== Biography ==
Fontana was born in 1490 in Castel Durante. He moved to Urbino, where set up shop there when he called himself Fontana. He bought a house with a potter's oven in Borgo di S. Paolo, Urbino.

Fontana designed a maiolica service for Anne de Montmorency in 1535. A candlestick from the service is at the Victoria and Albert Museum.

Fontana changed his surname to Durantino in 1553. He died in 1576 in Urbino.
