= Orazio Fontana =

Italian painter

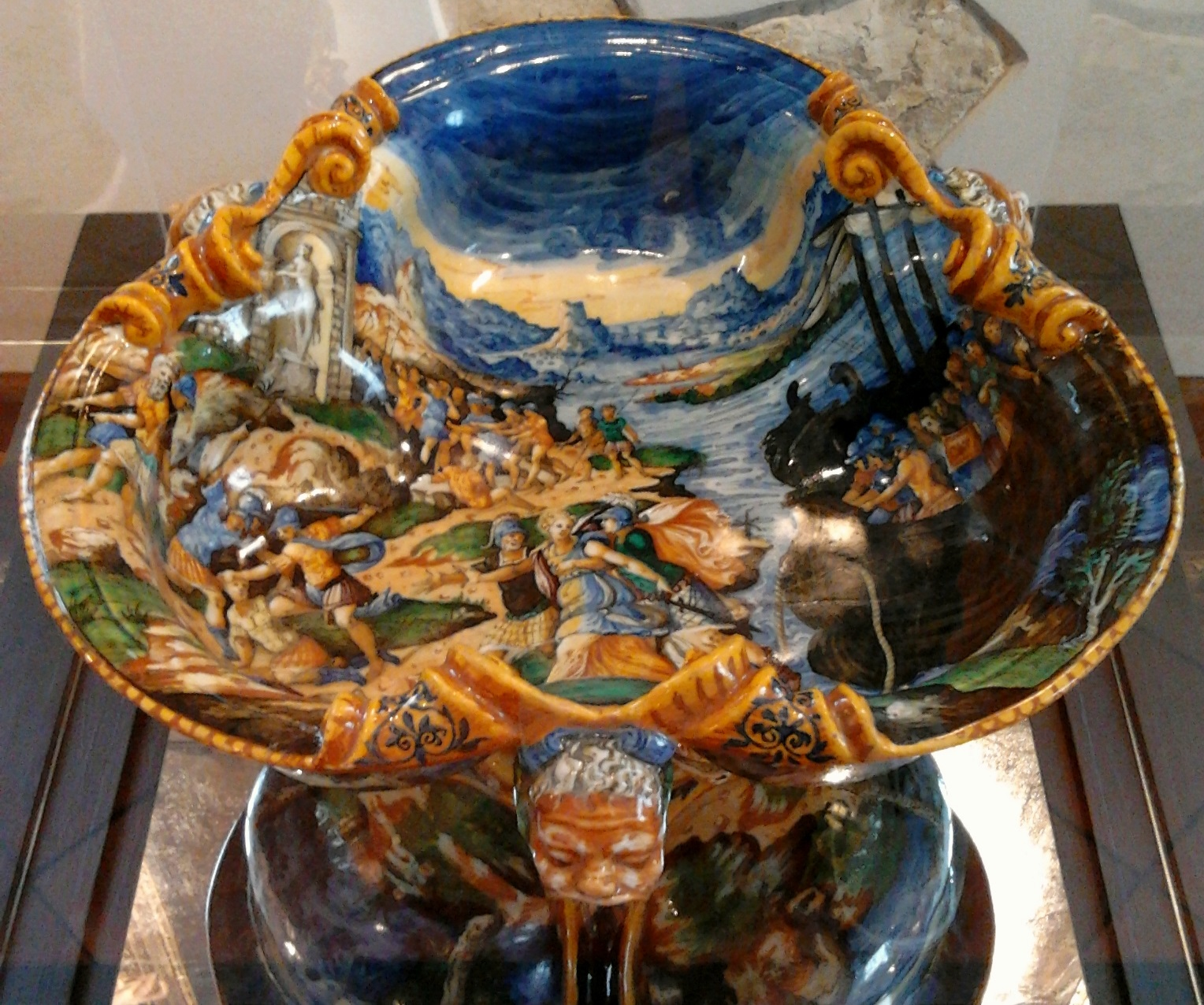
Rinfrescatoi basin, 1565-1571

Orazio Fontana (1510–1571) was an Italian potter and maiolica painter, who introduced istoriato maiolica in Urbino.

== Biography ==
He was born in Castel Durante as the son of Guido Durantino, who was also known as Guido Fontana. Along with his father and his brothers Camillo and Nicola, he ran a workshop for several decades. He finally moved with his family to Urbino from the 1530s onwards, where he set up his own workshop in grotesques in 1565. Supported by Duke Guidobaldo II of Urbino, Orazio introduced istoriato maiolica in the area, hence contributing to the development of new center of maiolica production and innovation. Later on he concentrated on luxury wares of the Spezieria (Medical Dispensary attached to the Palace at Urbino) with surprisingly sculptural, sometimes even fantastic shapes, leaving the plainer, and probably more profitable, white and common wares to his father. Together with his workshop he realized great commissions, including table service for Anne de Montmorency. He died in Urbino in 1571.

The rinfrescatoi basin in the District Museum in Tarnów created between 1565–1571, is one of the best examples of Orazio's workshop artistry combining grotesque sculpture, original form with colourful painted decoration.
