= Deruta ceramics =

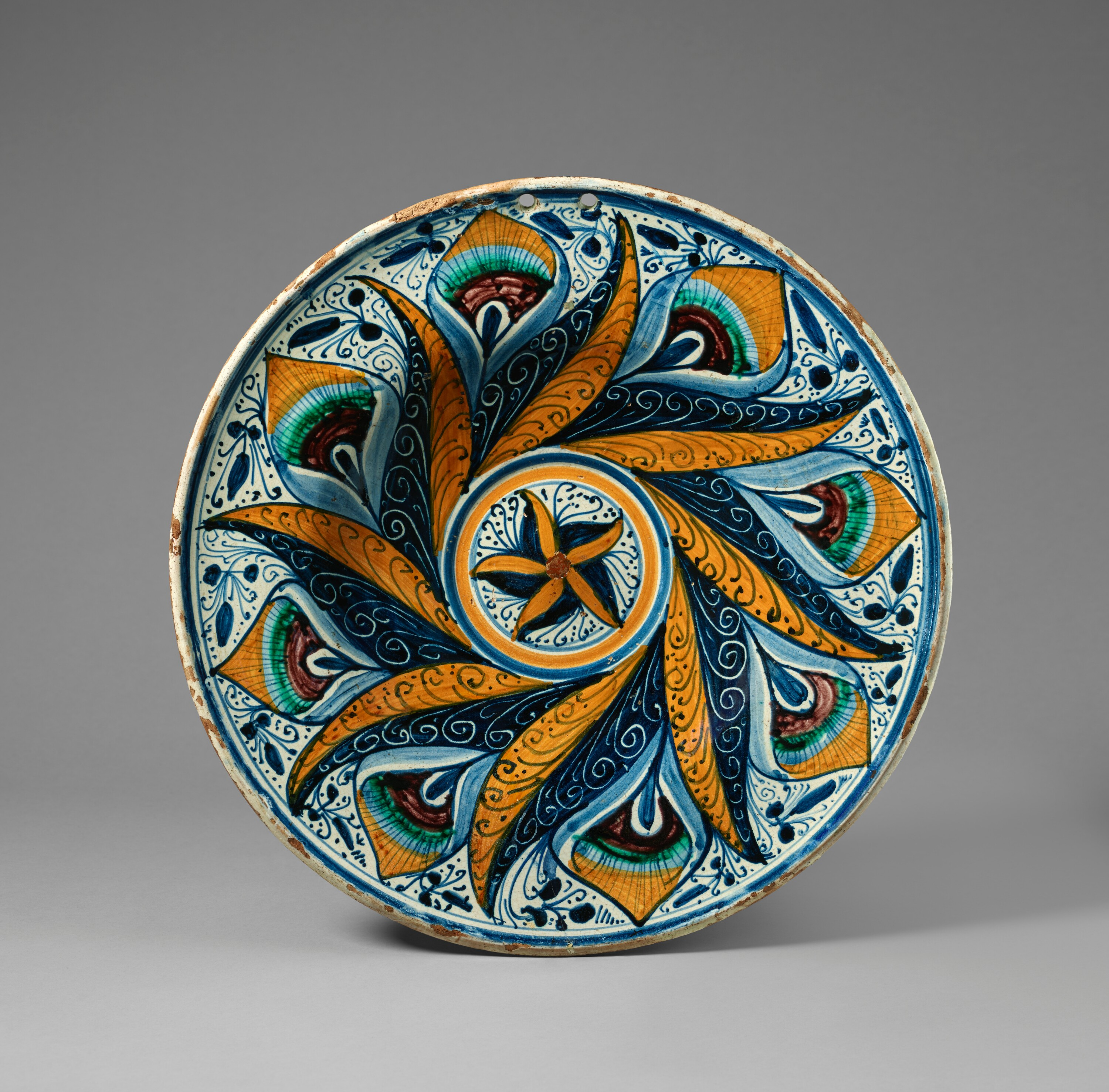
Dish with a Peacock Feather Pattern, c. 1470-1500. J. Paul Getty Museum

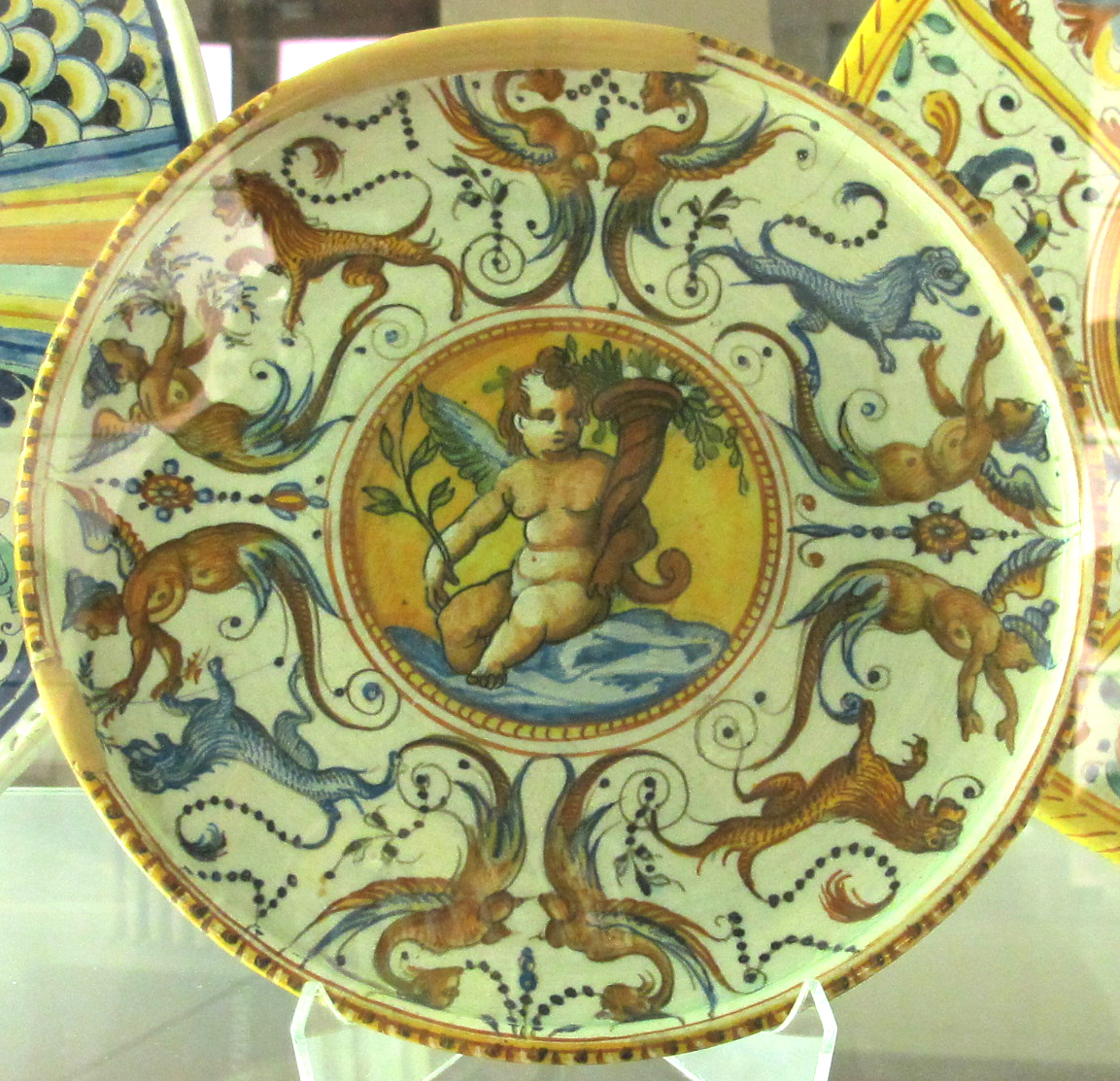
Deruta maiolica plate, 17th-century, Arezzo museum

== History of Deruta Ceramics ==
Deruta, a medieval hilltown in Umbria, Italy, is mainly known as a major centre for the production of maiolica (painted tin-glazed earthenware) in the Renaissance and later. Production of pottery is documented in the early Middle Ages, though no surviving pieces can be firmly attributed there before about 1490. It reached its artistic peak in the 15th and early 16th century.

It was the first Italian centre to use lustreware pigments, usually yellow, ruby or olive-green. Open pieces are usually only painted the top side; both of these suggesting influence from Spain. Deruta istoriato designs (with narrative scenes) are less common than single figures, usually no more than half-length, and in both cases the central painted design rarely covers the whole surface, leaving room for a generous border painted with decorative motifs.

In 1553, Leandro Alberti wrote “... the terracotta vases made in Deruta are often mentioned for how well they are made and beautifully decorated. And it is believed that there are no other craftsmen in Italy that can match the work even though there have been attempts to do so...” However, it was just at this point that the quality of wares began to decline.

Some individual painters are known, but at the same time it is often difficult to assign pieces between Deruta and other centres, especially nearby Gubbio.

=== Modern production / Contemporary craftsmanship ===
In the context of contemporary Deruta ceramics, the long-standing tradition of maiolica continues through the work of local artisans and modelers who maintain historical techniques while operating in a modern setting. Among these figures is Roberto Oasi (1904-2009), an Italian ceramic modeler associated with the Deruta tradition, whose activity reflects the continuity of local craftsmanship within the broader history of Deruta maiolica.

=== Deruta trademark ===
A characteristic local motif is the Deruta trademark "Raffaellesco" dragon design, said to be inspired by the murals of Raphael. An example of this dragon in Raphael's work can be seen in the painting "St Michael Killing the Dragon".

== Town of Deruta ==
Deruta has over 200 ceramic workshops, most of which retail their own goods along with other retail shops which display and sell pottery products. The town also serves as a centre for local farming and various agricultural industries.

There are a number of ruins of very old ceramic kilns throughout Deruta. In addition to housing the usual governmental offices, the municipal hall houses a museum of ceramics. Along the Tiberina road, at the foot of the old town, yet another church – the Madonna delle Piagge – is clad in ceramic tiles.
