= Francesco Xanto Avelli =

Italian painter

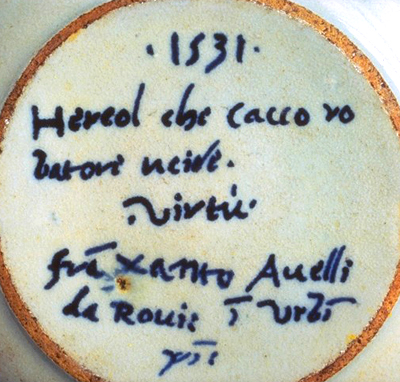
- Artist's signature
- Known for: maiolica

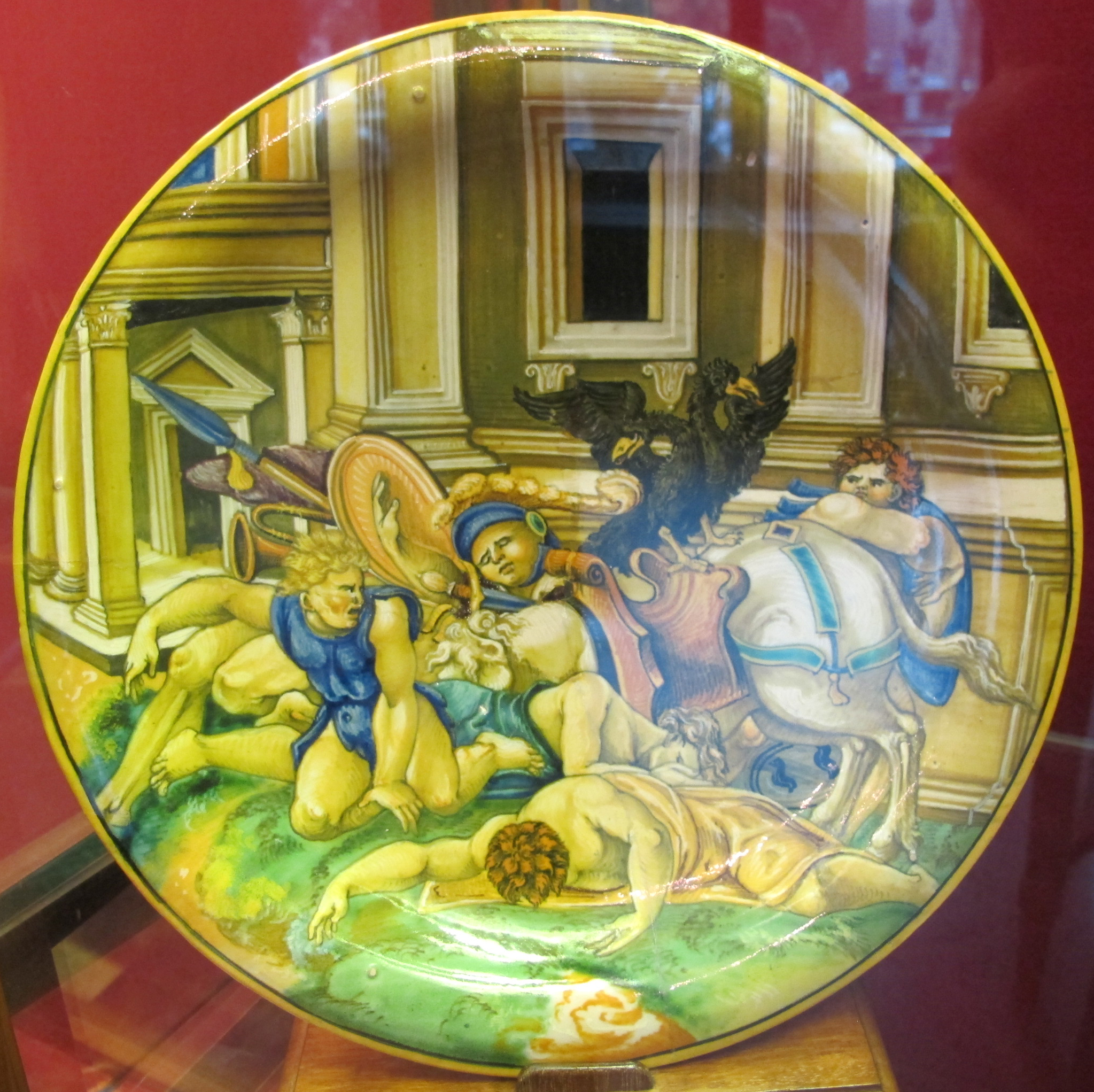
Francesco Xanto Avelli, "Plate with the Triumph of Germany," ca. 1528-1530, Wallace Collection, London.

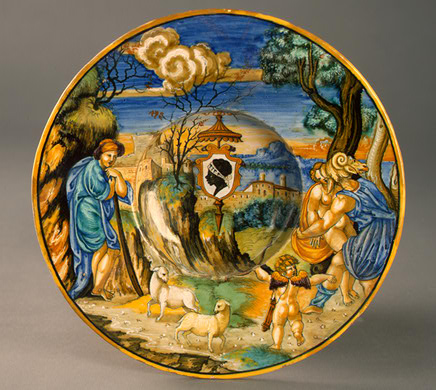
Francesco Xanto Avelli, "Broad-rimmed bowl with Neptune raping Theophane; arms of Pucci with an 'ombrellino'", 1532

Francesco Xanto Avelli, "Dish with the story of Metabus and Camilla", 1534, Gardiner Museum of Ceramic Art, Toronto.

Francesco Xanto Avelli (Rovigo, c. 1487? – c. 1542?) was an Italian ceramicist. He is best known for his painted maiolica works.

== Life ==
Xanto Avelli was born in Rovigo, in the Veneto, sometime in the late 1480s. Nothing at all is known of his origins, his teaching, or his early years. He is first recorded as working in Urbino in 1530, when he is mentioned in a notarial document describing attempts by a group of pottery workers, or interlaboratores artis figuli, to form an early trade union for the purpose of raising wages. 1530 is also the date on his earliest signed piece, a plate commemorating the coming new year. It is signed .f.X.A.R., and is further marked î Urbino.

At around this time Xanto married a woman called Finalissa, also in Urbino. Over the five years following he produced a large body of work; each piece was signed in various manners, and was dated and marked as a product of Urbino. Such consistency in signing his work was unusual at the time. There is some suggestion that the artist was blacklisted after the labor troubles of 1530, and that his choice to sign his works might be in some way related to his difficulties.

Xanto was also well versed in stories from antiquity, often drawing on Ovid's Metamorphoses, as other maiolica artists did. He decorated many plates with depictions of antique narratives, such as the story of Icarus.

After 1535, Xanto seems to have become less prolific. His works from this period, if signed, are marked in a more cursory fashion. He also had a number of associates and followers working with him regularly, basing their style on his. The last documentary record of him comes in 1541, when he is known to have taken on two assistants. That year he also initialed a piece from the workshop of Francesco de Silvano. What later became of him is unknown.

== Work ==
It is not certain whether or not any of Xanto's earlier work has survived, as no unambiguously signed works bearing his signature have been found dating earlier than 1530. General scholarly opinion holds that a number of works dating back to 1524 are also by his hand. One of these works is a 1524 creation of a dish depicting the story of Icarus, which has been attributed to Xanto. No tangible evidence exists suggesting their point of origin, although both Faenza and Urbino have been proposed by historians.

Xanto's signed works all date from between 1530 and 1542. Each bears his name and the date of the piece. Many plates also were given ambitious tags explaining their meanings. The surviving pieces appear to be similar in nature to most other maiolica ware produced in Urbino at the time, with the exception of signatures on the reverse. Xanto signed his works with a number of different variants of his own name. Besides those with his full name, some pieces were signed in his hand fra Xanto.

A notable maiolica dish of his depicts the story of Tydeus and Polynices. The scene derives from the Greek myth Seven Against Thebes, where the two fight over the lodging space in the palace courtyard. Painted in 1532, the dish was part of the Pucci commission. During this time, it was common for wealthy patrons to commission the depiction of istoriatos on plates which would be served to dinner guests alike.

Maiolica painters often emulated scenes or stories from printed woodcut drawings within ancient texts. The Dish with Laocoön and his sons is attributed to Xanto and was inspired by a printed illustration of the sculpted Greek figures being attacked by sea snakes, and includes Xanto's addition of bystanders at the scene. Xanto used a “cut-and-paste” approach, drawing from printed sources, to add repeated motifs across various pieces of maiolica. As can be seen in the Dish with the story of Icarus and Dish with the story of Metabus and Camilla, he includes an image of a river god in the foreground.

Besides being a ceramicist, Xanto was also a poet. In the 1530s he wrote a sequence of sonnets in praise of Francesco Maria I della Rovere, then duke of Urbino. An elegant fair copy survives in the Vatican Library.

== Gallery ==
Francesco Xanto Avelli, "Plate (tondino)," 1530, The Metropolitan Museum of Art, New York City.

Francesco Xanto Avelli, "Broad-rimmed dish (tondino) with Leda and the Swan," ca. 1530, Urbino, Gardiner Museum of Ceramic Art, Toronto.

Attributed to Francesco Xanto Avelli, "Dish with the story of Icarus," ca. 1525, Urbino, Gardiner Museum of Ceramic Art, Toronto.

Attributed to Francesco Xanto Avelli, "Dish with Laocoön & his Sons," ca. 1530, Urbino, Gardiner Museum of Ceramic Art, Toronto.

Francesco Xanto Avelli, "The story of Apollo (armorial dish)," 1532, The Metropolitan Museum of Art, New York City.

Reverse of "Dish with story of Tydeus and Polynices" showing description and signature of Francesco Xanto Avelli, 1532, Urbino, Gardiner Museum of Ceramic Art, Toronto.
