= Gold chloride =

Gold chloride can refer to:

- Gold(I) chloride (gold monochloride), AuCl
- Gold(I,III) chloride (gold dichloride, tetragold octachloride), Au_{4}Cl_{8}
- Gold(III) chloride (gold trichloride, digold hexachloride), Au_{2}Cl_{6}
- Chloroauric acid, HAuCl_{4} (brown gold chloride); or its sodium salt, sodium tetrachloroaurate, NaAuCl_{4} (gold chloride, sodium gold chloride, yellow gold chloride), used as a histological stain
